There are 3878 species and 18 subspecies in the order Perciformes assessed as least concern by the International Union for Conservation of Nature.

Gouramis 

Slender betta (Betta bellica)
Peaceful betta (Betta imbellis)
Spotted betta (Betta picta)
Betta prima
Paradise fish (Macropodus opercularis)
Giant gourami (Osphronemus goramy)
Parasphaerichthys ocellatus
Spiketail paradise fish (Pseudosphromenus cupanus)
Honey gourami (Trichogaster chuna)
Trichogaster fasciata
Thick-lipped gourami (Trichogaster labiosus)
Dwarf gourami (Trichogaster lalius)
Moonlight gourami (Trichopodus microlepis)
Snakeskin gourami (Trichopodus pectoralis)
Three spot gourami (Trichopodus trichopterus)
Pygmy gourami (Trichopsis pumila)
Mekong croaking guorami (Trichopsis schalleri)
Croaking gourami (Trichopsis vittata)

Cichlids 

Species

Aequidens patricki
Alticorpus macrocleithrum
Alticorpus mentale
Alticorpus pectinatum
Alticorpus peterdaviesi
Alticorpus profundicula
Altolamprologus compressiceps
Pearl cichlid (Amphilophus rhytisma)
Andinoacara blombergi
Andinoacara latifrons
Anomalochromis thomasi
Apistogramma allpahuayo
Apistogramma baenschi
Apistogramma barlowi
Cruzi (Apistogramma cruzi)
Apistogramma eremnopyge
Apistogramma gephyra
Apistogramma linkei
Apistogramma luelingi
Apistogramma martini
Panduro (Apistogramma panduro)
Apistogramma similis
Apistogramma urteagai
Archocentrus spinosissimus
Aristochromis christyi
Alluaud's haplo (Astatoreochromis alluaudi)
Bluelip haplo (Astatoreochromis straeleni)
Astatoreochromis vanderhorsti
Astatotilapia burtoni
Eastern river bream (Astatotilapia calliptera)
Astatotilapia paludinosa
Astatotilapia stappersii
Nkhomo-benga peacock (Aulonocara baenschi)
Aulonocara brevinidus
Aulonocara gertrudae
Aulonocara guentheri
Fairy cichlid (Aulonocara jacobfreibergi)
Aulonocara rostratum
Greenface aulonocara (Aulonocara saulosi)
Aulonocara stonemani
Flavescent peacock (Aulonocara stuartgranti)
Aulonocranus dewindti
Baileychromis centropomoides
Bathybates fasciatus
Bathybates ferox
Bathybates graueri
Bathybates hornii
Bathybates leo
Bathybates minor
Bathybates vittatus
Benthochromis melanoides
Benthochromis tricoti
Giant cichlid (Boulengerochromis microlepis)
Buccochromis heterotaenia
Slender tail hap (Buccochromis lepturus)
Stripeback hap (Buccochromis nototaenia)
Buccochromis rhoadesii
Buccochromis spectabilis
Bujurquina apoparuana
Bujurquina cordemadi
Bujurquina eurhinus
Bujurquina hophrys
Bujurquina huallagae
Bujurquina labiosa
Bujurquina megalospilus
Bujurquina moriorum
Bujurquina syspilus
Bujurquina tambopatae
Bujurquina zamorensis
Callochromis macrops
Callochromis melanostigma
Callochromis pleurospilus
Caprichromis liemi
Caprichromis orthognathous
Caquetaia myersi
Cardiopharynx schoutedeni
Chaetobranchus semifasciatus
Chalinochromis brichardi
Champsochromis caeruleus
Champsochromis spilorhynchus
Malawi thicklip (Cheilochromis euchilus)
Buzi river bream (Chetia brevicauda)
Canary kurper (Chetia flaviventris)
Chetia gracilis
Chilochromis duponti
Chilotilapia rhoadesii
Chromidotilapia guntheri
Chromidotilapia kingsleyae
Chromidotilapia mamonekenei
Chromidotilapia melaniae
Chromidotilapia mrac
Chromidotilapia schoutedeni
Cichlasoma atromaculatum
Cichlasoma ornatum
Congochromis dimidiatus
Congochromis sabinae
Congochromis squamiceps
Copadichromis azureus
Haplochromis borleyi redfin (Copadichromis borleyi)
Copadichromis chrysonotus
Copadichromis cyaneus
Copadichromis eucinostomus
Copadichromis flavimanus
Copadichromis ilesi
Copadichromis jacksoni
Copadichromis likomae
Copadichromis mloto
Copadichromis pleurostigma
Copadichromis pleurostigmoides
Copadichromis prostoma
Copadichromis quadrimaculatus
Verduya's hap (Copadichromis trimaculatus)
Corematodus shiranus
Corematodus taeniatus
Crenicichla anthurus
Crenicichla cincta
Pike cichlid (Crenicichla lepidota)
Crenicichla macrophthalma
Crenicichla sedentaria
Ctenochromis benthicola
Ctenochromis horei
Blackspot climbing perch (Ctenopharynx intermedius)
Ctenopharynx nitidus
Ctenopharynx pictus
Cunningtonia longiventralis
Cyathochromis obliquidens
Featherfin cichlid (Cyathopharynx furcifer)
Cyclopharynx fwae
Cyclopharynx schwetzi
Cynotilapia afra
Cyphotilapia frontosa
Cyprichromis leptosoma
Cyrtocara moorii
Malawi eyebiter (Dimidiochromis compressiceps)
Ncheni type haplochromis (Dimidiochromis dimidiatus)
Dimidiochromis kiwinge
Haplochromis sunset (Dimidiochromis strigatus)
Diplotaxodon aeneus
Diplotaxodon apogon
Diplotaxodon argenteus
Diplotaxodon greenwoodi
Diplotaxodon limnothrissa
Diplotaxodon macrops
Divandu albimarginatus
Docimodus evelynae
Docimodus johnstoni
Eclectochromis lobochilus
Eclectochromis ornatus
Ectodus descampsii
Orange chromide (Etroplus maculatus)
Green chromide (Etroplus suratensis)
Threespot torpedo (Exochochromis anagenys)
Fossorochromis rostratus
Genyochromis mento
Geophagus brachybranchus
Gephyrochromis lawsi
Gephyrochromis moorii
Gnathochromis permaxillaris
Gnathochromis pfefferi
Grammatotria lemairii
Greenwoodochromis bellcrossi
Greenwoodochromis christyi
Guianacara oelemariensis
Haplochromis angustifrons
Haplochromis bakongo
Haplochromis chilotes
Haplochromis crebidens
Haplochromis degeni
Haplochromis eduardianus
Haplochromis elegans
Haplochromis flavus
Haplochromis torpedo stripe (Haplochromis gracilior)
Haplochromis graueri
Velvet black (Haplochromis greenwoodi)
Haplochromis insidiae
Haplochromis kamiranzovu
Haplochromis laparogramma
Haplochromis limax
Haplochromis lucullae
Haplochromis macconneli
Haplochromis macropsoides
Haplochromis mbipi
Haplochromis microchrysomelas
Haplochromis mylodon
Haplochromis nigripinnis
Haplochromis nigroides
Haplochromis nyererei
Haplochromis occultidens
Haplochromis oligacanthus
Haplochromis olivaceus
Haplochromis omnicaeruleus
Haplochromis pappenheimi
Haplochromis paropius
Haplochromis paucidens
Haplochromis pundamilia
Haplochromis pyrrhocephalus
Haplochromis riponianus
Haplochromis rubescens
Haplochromis rubripinnis
Haplochromis rudolfianus
Haplochromis rufocaudalis
Haplochromis rufus
Haplochromis scheffersi
Haplochromis schubotzi
Haplochromis schubotziellus
Haplochromis squamipinnis
Haplochromis stigmatogenys
Haplochromis tanaos
Haplochromis taurinus
Haplochromis turkanae
Haplochromis vittatus
Haplochromis xenognathus
Haplotaxodon microlepis
Hemibates stenosoma
African jewelfish (Hemichromis bimaculatus)
Banded jewel cichlid (Hemichromis elongatus)
Hemichromis exsul
Hemichromis fasciatus
Hemichromis letourneuxi
Hemichromis lifalili
Hemichromis stellifer
Hemitaeniochromis urotaenia
Giant haplochromis (Hemitilapia oxyrhynchus)
Texas cichlid (Herichthys cyanoguttatus)
Heroina isonycterina
Heterochromis multidens
Julidochromis dickfeldi
Julidochromis marlieri
Golden julie (Julidochromis ornatus)
Convict julie (Julidochromis regani)
Masked julie (Julidochromis transcriptus)
Blue mbuna (Labeotropheus fuelleborni)
Scrapermouth mbuna (Labeotropheus trewavasae)
Blue streak hap (Labidochromis caeruleus)
Labidochromis maculicauda
Labidochromis mathotho
Labidochromis shiranus
Labidochromis textilis
Labidochromis vellicans
Lamprologus callipterus
Lamprologus congoensis
Lamprologus lemairii
Lamprologus mocquardi
Lamprologus ocellatus
Lamprologus ornatipinnis
Lamprologus signatus
Lepidiolamprologus cunningtoni
Lepidiolamprologus elongatus
Lepidiolamprologus profundicola
Lestradea perspicax
Lestradea stappersii
Lethrinops albus
Lethrinops altus
Lethrinops argenteus
Golden sand-eater (Lethrinops auritus)
Lethrinops christyi
Greenface sandsifter (Lethrinops furcifer)
Lethrinops gossei
Lethrinops leptodon
Lethrinops lethrinus
Lethrinops longimanus
Lethrinops lunaris
Lethrinops macrochir
Lethrinops rounded head (Lethrinops marginatus)
Littletooth sandeater (Lethrinops microstoma)
Lethrinops red flush (Lethrinops parvidens)
Lethrinops polli
Lethrinops turneri
Malawi gar (Lichnochromis acuticeps)
Limnochromis abeelei
Spangled cichlid (Limnochromis auritus)
Limnochromis staneri
Limnotilapia dardennii
Lobochilotes labiatus
Maylandia barlowi
Maylandia crabro
Maylandia elegans
Maylandia fainzilberi
Maylandia livingstonii
Zebra mbuna (Maylandia zebra)
Golden mbuna (Melanochromis auratus)
Melanochromis benetos
Melanochromis brevis
Melanochromis labrosus
Melanochromis melanopterus
Melanochromis robustus
Melanochromis simulans
Purple mbuna (Melanochromis vermivorus)
Mesonauta mirificus
Mylochromis anaphyrmus
Mylochromis balteatus
Mylochromis epichorialis
Mylochromis ericotaenia
Mylochromis formosus
Mylochromis guentheri
Golden mola hap (Mylochromis incola)
Mylochromis labidodon
Basket hap (Mylochromis lateristriga)
Haplochromis yellow black line (Mylochromis melanonotus)
Mylochromis melanotaenia
Mylochromis mola
Softy hap (Mylochromis mollis)
Mylochromis obtusus
Mylochromis plagiotaenia
Mylochromis semipalatus
Roundtooth hap (Mylochromis sphaerodon)
Mylochromis subocularis
Naevochromis chrysogaster
Nanochromis nudiceps
Nanochromis parilus
Nanochromis teugelsi
Neolamprologus boulengeri
Neolamprologus brevis
Neolamprologus brichardi
Neolamprologus caudopunctatus
Neolamprologus crassus
Neolamprologus falcicula
Neolamprologus fasciatus
Neolamprologus furcifer
Neolamprologus gracilis
Neolamprologus hecqui
Neolamprologus leleupi
Neolamprologus leloupi
Neolamprologus longior
Neolamprologus meeli
Neolamprologus modestus
Neolamprologus mondabu
Neolamprologus moorii
Neolamprologus multifasciatus
Neolamprologus mustax
Neolamprologus niger
Neolamprologus obscurus
Neolamprologus petricola
Neolamprologus pleuromaculatus
Neolamprologus prochilus
Neolamprologus pulcher
Neolamprologus savoryi
Neolamprologus sexfasciatus
Neolamprologus splendens
Fourspine cichlid (Neolamprologus tetracanthus)
Neolamprologus toae
Neolamprologus tretocephalus
Nimbochromis fuscotaeniatus
Nimbochromis linni
Nimbochromis livingstonii
Nimbochromis polystigma
Nimbochromis venustus
Nyassachromis breviceps
Small green utaka (Nyassachromis leuciscus)
Nyassachromis microcephalus
Nyassachromis nigritaeniatus
Nyassachromis purpurans
Nyassachromis serenus
Ophthalmotilapia boops
Ophthalmotilapia heterodonta
Ophthalmotilapia nasuta
Ophthalmotilapia ventralis
Oreochromis angolensis
Oreochromis korogwe
Oreochromis leucostictus
Mweru tilapia (Oreochromis mweruensis)
Black tilapia (Oreochromis placidus)
Oreochromis schwebischi
Oreochromis tanganicae
Oreochromis upembae
Orthochromis kalungwishiensis
Cunene dwarf happy (Orthochromis machadoi)
Orthochromis polyacanthus
Orthochromis stormsi
Orthochromis torrenticola
Otopharynx argyrosoma
Golden-margined hap (Otopharynx auromarginatus)
Otopharynx brooksi
Otopharynx decorus
Royal blue hap (Otopharynx heterodon)
Otopharynx ovatus
Otopharynx selenurus
Otopharynx speciosus
Otopharynx tetraspilus
Otopharynx tetrastigma
Pallidochromis tokolosh
Monarch cichlid (Parachromis friedrichsthalii)
Paracyprichromis brieni
Paracyprichromis nigripinnis
Parananochromis caudifasciatus
Parananochromis gabonicus
Parananochromis longirostris
Paretroplus tsimoly
Pelmatochromis buettikoferi
Pelmatochromis nigrofasciatus
Pelvicachromis humilis
Common krib (Pelvicachromis pulcher)
Pelvicachromis taeniatus
Perissodus microlepis
Petrochromis famula
Petrochromis fasciolatus
Petrochromis orthognathus
Petrochromis polyodon
Threadfin cichlid (Petrochromis trewavasae)
Petrotilapia genalutea
Petrotilapia tridentiger
Dwarf bream (Pharyngochromis acuticeps)
Deep-water hap (Placidochromis electra)
Placidochromis hennydaviesae
Placidochromis johnstoni
Placidochromis longimanus
Super VC-10 hap (Placidochromis milomo)
Placidochromis phenochilus
Placidochromis stonemani
Placidochromis subocularis
Plecodus elaviae
Plecodus multidentatus
Plecodus paradoxus
Plecodus straeleni
Protomelas annectens
Fenestratus (Protomelas fenestratus)
One-and-a-half-stripe hap (Protomelas insignis)
Protomelas kirkii
Protomelas labridens
Protomelas marginatus
Protomelas pleurotaenia
Protomelas similis
Protomelas spilonotus
Protomelas spilopterus
Spindle hap (Protomelas taeniolatus)
Protomelas triaenodon
Egyptian mouthbrooder (Pseudocrenilabrus multicolor)
Pseudocrenilabrus nicholsi
Pseudosimochromis curvifrons
Pseudotropheus lucerna
Pseudotropheus macrophthalmus
Pseudotropheus minutus
Pseudotropheus perspicax
Pindani (Pseudotropheus socolofi)
Red top williamsi (Pseudotropheus williamsi)
Pterochromis congicus
Ptychochromis grandidieri
Ptychochromis oligacanthus
Reganochromis calliurus
Rhamphochromis esox
Rhamphochromis longiceps
Rhamphochromis lucius
Rhamphochromis macrophthalmus
Rhamphochromis woodi
Rainbow bream (Sargochromis carlottae)
Sargochromis codringtonii
Kunene bream (Sargochromis coulteri)
Pink bream (Sargochromis giardi)
Deepcheek bream (Sargochromis greenwoodi)
Snaileater (Sargochromis mellandi)
Sargochromis mortimeri
Sarotherodon caudomarginatus
Sarotherodon mvogoi
Schwetzochromis neodon
Electric blue hap (Sciaenochromis ahli)
Sciaenochromis benthicola
Sciaenochromis fryeri
Sciaenochromis gracilis
Electric blue kande (Sciaenochromis psammophilus)
Sciaenochromis spilostichus
Humpback largemouth (Serranochromis altus)
Thinface cichlid (Serranochromis angusticeps)
Longfin largemouth (Serranochromis longimanus)
Purpleface largemouth (Serranochromis macrocephalus)
Yellow-belly bream (Serranochromis robustus)
Serranochromis spei
Serranochromis stappersi
Brownspot largemouth (Serranochromis thumbergi)
Simochromis babaulti
Simochromis diagramma
Simochromis loocki
Simochromis pleurospilus
Spathodus erythrodon
Spathodus marlieri
Lionhead cichlid (Steatocranus casuarius)
Steatocranus gibbiceps
Steatocranus tinanti
Stigmatochromis modestus
Candle hap (Stigmatochromis pholidophorus)
Stigmatochromis woodi
Taeniochromis holotaenia
Taeniolethrinops cyrtonotus
Taeniolethrinops furcicauda
Taeniolethrinops laticeps
Taeniolethrinops praeorbitalis
Tangachromis dhanisi
Spotfin goby cichlid (Tanganicodus irsacae)
Telmatochromis bifrenatus
Telmatochromis brachygnathus
Telmatochromis dhonti
Telmatochromis temporalis
Telmatochromis vittatus
Thicklipped happy (Thoracochromis albolabris)
Thoracochromis brauschi
Namib happy (Thoracochromis buysi)
Thoracochromis callichromus
Thysochromis ansorgii
Tilapia baloni
Tilapia bilineata
Tilapia brevimanus
Tilapia buttikoferi
Tilapia cabrae
Tilapia cameronensis
Tilapia congica
Tilapia dageti
Guinean tilapia (Tilapia guineensis)
Tilapia louka
Tilapia margaritacea
Spotted tilapia (Tilapia mariae)
Tilapia nyongana
Redbreast tilapia (Tilapia rendalli)
Okavango tilapia (Tilapia ruweti)
Banded tilapia (Tilapia sparrmanii)
Tilapia tholloni
Tramitichromis brevis
Tramitichromis intermedius
Tramitichromis lituris
Tramitichromis trilineatus
Tramitichromis variabilis
Trematocara caparti
Trematocara kufferathi
Trematocara macrostoma
Trematocara marginatum
Trematocara nigrifrons
Trematocara stigmaticum
Trematocara unimaculatum
Trematocara variabile
Trematocranus labifer
Haplochromis placodon pointed head (Trematocranus microstoma)
Trematocranus placodon
Triglachromis otostigma
Tropheops macrophthalmus
Tropheops novemfasciatus
Tropheus annectens
Tropheus brichardi
Tropheus kasabae
Blunthead cichlid (Tropheus moorii)
Tylochromis aristoma
Hump-back bream (Tylochromis bangwelensis)
Tylochromis intermedius
Tylochromis jentinki
Tylochromis labrodon
Tylochromis lateralis
Tylochromis leonensis
Mweru hump-backed bream (Tylochromis mylodon)
Tylochromis polylepis
Tylochromis pulcher
Tylochromis robertsi
Tylochromis sudanensis
Tylochromis variabilis
Tyrannochromis macrostoma
Tyrannochromis nigriventer
Xenotilapia bathyphilus
Xenotilapia boulengeri
Xenotilapia caudofasciata
Yellow sand cichlid (Xenotilapia flavipinnis)
Xenotilapia leptura
Xenotilapia longispinis
Xenotilapia nigrolabiata
Xenotilapia ochrogenys
Xenotilapia ornatipinnis
Xenotilapia sima
Xenotilapia tenuidentata

Subspecies

Rovuma tilapia (Oreochromis placidus placidus)
Oreochromis placidus rovumae
Oreochromis upembae malagarasi
Dwarf Victoria mouthbrooder (Pseudocrenilabrus multicolor victoriae)
Sarotherodon galilaeus boulengeri
Galilaea tilapia (Sarotherodon galilaeus galilaeus)
Upper Zambezi nembwe (Serranochromis robustus jallae)
Serranochromis robustus robustus

Percids 

Naked sand darter (Ammocrypta beanii)
Florida sand darter (Ammocrypta bifascia)
Southern sand darter (Ammocrypta meridiana)
Eastern sand darter (Ammocrypta pellucida)
Scaly sand darter (Ammocrypta vivax)
Redspot darter (Etheostoma artesiae)
Mud darter (Etheostoma asprigene)
Cumberland snubnose darter (Etheostoma atripinne)
Autumn darter (Etheostoma autumnale)
Emerald darter (Etheostoma baileyi)
Teardrop darter (Etheostoma barbouri)
Splendid darter (Etheostoma barrenense)
Corrugated darter (Etheostoma basilare)
Orangefin darter (Etheostoma bellum)
Buffalo darter (Etheostoma bison)
Greenside darter (Etheostoma blennioides)
Blenny darter (Etheostoma blennius)
Carolina fantail darter (Etheostoma brevispinum)
Brook darter (Etheostoma burri)
Rainbow darter (Etheostoma caeruleum)
Bluebreast darter (Etheostoma camurum)
Greenfin darter (Etheostoma chlorobranchium)
Bluntnose darter (Etheostoma chlorosomum)
Lipstick darter (Etheostoma chuckwachatte)
Creole darter (Etheostoma collettei)
Carolina darter (Etheostoma collis)
Coastal darter (Etheostoma colorosum)
Coosa darter (Etheostoma coosae)
Fringed darter (Etheostoma crossopterum)
Choctawhatchee darter (Etheostoma davisoni)
Stone darter (Etheostoma derivativum)
Tuskaloosa darter (Etheostoma douglasi)
Blackside snubnose darter (Etheostoma duryi)
Brown darter (Etheostoma edwini)
Meramec saddled darter (Etheostoma erythrozonum)
Cherry darter (Etheostoma etnieri)
Arkansas saddled darter (Etheostoma euzonum)
Iowa darter (Etheostoma exile)
Fantail darter (Etheostoma flabellare)
Saffron darter (Etheostoma flavum)
Strawberry darter (Etheostoma fragi)
Savannah darter (Etheostoma fricksium)
Swamp darter (Etheostoma fusiforme)
Slough darter (Etheostoma gracile)
Tuckasegee darter (Etheostoma gutselli)
Harlequin darter (Etheostoma histrio)
Christmas darter (Etheostoma hopkinsi)
Turquoise darter (Etheostoma inscriptum)
Blueside darter (Etheostoma jessiae)
Greenbreast darter (Etheostoma jordani)
Yoke darter (Etheostoma juliae)
Kanawha darter (Etheostoma kanawhae)
Highland Rim darter (Etheostoma kantuckeense)
Stripetail darter (Etheostoma kennicotti)
Tombigbee darter (Etheostoma lachneri)
Headwater darter (Etheostoma lawrencei)
Longfin darter (Etheostoma longimanum)
Redband darter (Etheostoma luteovinctum)
Brighteye darter (Etheostoma lynceum)
Pinewoods darter (Etheostoma mariae)
Least darter (Etheostoma microperca)
Sunburst darter (Etheostoma mihileze)
Blackfin darter (Etheostoma nigripinne)
Johnny darter (Etheostoma nigrum)
Barcheek darter (Etheostoma obeyense)
Westrim darter (Etheostoma occidentale)
Okaloosa darter (Etheostoma okaloosae)
Sooty darter (Etheostoma olivaceum)
Tessellated darter (Etheostoma olmstedi)
Guardian darter (Etheostoma oophylax)
Eastrim darter (Etheostoma orientale)
Goldstripe darter (Etheostoma parvipinne)
Duck darter (Etheostoma planasaxatile)
Riverweed darter (Etheostoma podostemone)
Cypress darter (Etheostoma proeliare)
Stippled darter (Etheostoma punctulatum)
Orangebelly darter (Etheostoma radiosum)
Kentucky darter (Etheostoma rafinesquei)
Alabama darter (Etheostoma ramseyi)
Redline darter (Etheostoma rufilineatum)
Rock darter (Etheostoma rupestre)
Bloodfin darter (Etheostoma sanguifluum)
Sawcheek darter (Etheostoma serrifer)
Snubnose darter (Etheostoma simoterum)
Slabrock darter (Etheostoma smithi)
Orangethroat darter (Etheostoma spectabile)
Spottail darter (Etheostoma squamiceps)
Speckled darter (Etheostoma stigmaeum)
Gulf darter (Etheostoma swaini)
Swannanoa darter (Etheostoma swannanoa)
Tallapoosa darter (Etheostoma tallapoosae)
Tennessee darter (Etheostoma tennesseense)
Missouri saddled darter (Etheostoma tetrazonum)
Seagreen darter (Etheostoma thalassinum)
Current darter (Etheostoma uniporum)
Variegate darter (Etheostoma variatum)
Striped darter (Etheostoma virgatum)
Glassy darter (Etheostoma vitreum)
Wounded darter (Etheostoma vulneratum)
Redfin darter (Etheostoma whipplei)
Etheostoma zonale
Backwater darter (Etheostoma zonifer)
Bandfin darter (Etheostoma zonistium)
Donets ruffe (Gymnocephalus acerina)
Balon's ruffe (Gymnocephalus baloni)
Ruffe (Gymnocephalus cernua)
Schraetzer (Gymnocephalus schraetser)
Yellow perch (Perca flavescens)
European perch (Perca fluviatilis)
Azov percarina (Percarina maeotica)
Guadalupe darter (Percina apristis)
Tangerine darter (Percina aurantiaca)
Southern logperch (Percina austroperca)
Common logperch (Percina caprodes)
Texas logperch (Percina carbonaria)
Channel darter (Percina copelandi)
Piedmont darter (Percina crassa)
Gilt darter (Percina evides)
Ozark logperch (Percina fulvitaenia)
Appalachia darter (Percina gymnocephala)
Mobile logperch (Percina kathae)
Bigscale logperch (Percina macrolepida)
Blackside darter (Percina maculata)
Longnose darter (Percina nasuta)
Chainback darter (Percina nevisense)
Blackbanded darter (Percina nigrofasciata)
Stripeback darter (Percina notogramma)
Sharpnose darter (Percina oxyrhynchus)
Bronze darter (Percina palmaris)
Shield darter (Percina peltata)
Slenderhead darter (Percina phoxocephala)
Roanoke darter (Percina roanoka)
Dusky darter (Percina sciera)
River darter (Percina shumardi)
Frecklebelly darter (Percina stictogaster)
Gulf logperch (Percina suttkusi)
Saddleback darter (Percina vigil)
Sauger (Sander canadensis)
Zander (Sander lucioperca)
Walleye (Sander vitreus)
Volga pikeperch (Sander volgensis)
Streber (Zingel streber)
Common zingel (Zingel zingel)

Terapontids 

Large-scale grunter (Leiopotherapon macrolepis)
Silver grunter (Mesopristes argenteus)
Tapiroid grunter (Mesopristes cancellatus)
Sixlined trumpeter (Pelates sexlineatus)
Gilbert's grunter (Pingalla gilberti)
Midgley's grunter (Pingalla midgleyi)
Tiger perch (Terapon jarbua)
Largescaled terapon (Terapon theraps)

Epinephelids 

Mossfish (Alphestes afer)
Pacific mutton hamlet (Alphestes immaculatus)
Rivulated mutton hamlet (Alphestes multiguttatus)
Slender grouper (Anyperodon leucogrammicus)
Peacock grouper (Cephalopholis argus)
Bluelined coralcod (Cephalopholis boenak)
Graysby (Cephalopholis cruentata)
Blue spotted hind (Cephalopholis cyanostigma)
Bluelined hind (Cephalopholis formosa)
Black guativere (Cephalopholis fulva)
Leopard hind (Cephalopholis leopardus)
Freckled hind (Cephalopholis microprion)
Coral hind (Cephalopholis miniata)
Niger hind (Cephalopholis nigri)
Vermilion hind (Cephalopholis oligosticta)
Pacific graysby (Cephalopholis panamensis)
Harlequin hind (Cephalopholis polleni)
Cephalopholis polyspila
Six-blotch hind (Cephalopholis sexmaculata)
Tomato hind (Cephalopholis sonnerati)
Strawberry hind (Cephalopholis spiloparaea)
Flag-tailed rockcod (Cephalopholis urodeta)
Leather bass (Dermatolepis dermatolepis)
Epinephelus adscensionis
Rock bass spotted cabrilla (Epinephelus analogus)
Areolate grouper (Epinephelus areolatus)
Brown spotted reef cod (Epinephelus chlorostigma)
Epinephelus clippertonensis
Whitespotted grouper (Epinephelus coeruleopunctatus)
Speckled blue grouper (Epinephelus cyanopodus)
Blacktip grouper (Epinephelus fasciatus)
Blue and yellow grouper (Epinephelus flavocaeruleus)
Red hind (Epinephelus guttatus)
Hexagon grouper (Epinephelus hexagonatus)
Blacksaddle grouper (Epinephelus howlandi)
Marquesan grouper (Epinephelus irroratus)
Starry grouper (Epinephelus labriformis)
Longspine grouper (Epinephelus longispinis)
Snubnose grouper (Epinephelus macrospilos)
Highfin grouper (Epinephelus maculatus)
Honeycomb grouper (Epinephelus merra)
Netfin grouper (Epinephelus miliaris)
Comet grouper (Epinephelus morrhua)
White-blotched grouper (Epinephelus multinotatus)
White-streaked grouper (Epinephelus ongus)
Dot-dash grouper (Epinephelus poecilonotus)
Longfin grouper (Epinephelus quoyanus)
Oblique-banded grouper (Epinephelus radiatus)
Halfmoon grouper (Epinephelus rivulatus)
Foursaddle grouper (Epinephelus spilotoceps)
Black-dotted grouper (Epinephelus stictus)
Threespot grouper (Epinephelus trimaculatus)
Reticulate grouper (Epinephelus tuamotuensis)
Potato cod (Epinephelus tukula)
Spanish flag (Gonioplectrus hispanus)
Rooster hind (Hyporthodus acanthistius)
Sevenbar grouper (Hyporthodus ergastularius)
Misty grouper (Hyporthodus mystacinus)
Sevenband grouper (Hyporthodus septemfasciatus)
Western comb grouper (Mycteroperca acutirostris)
Gag (Mycteroperca microlepis)
Scamp grouper (Mycteroperca phenax)
Mottled grouper (Mycteroperca rubra)
Tiger grouper (Mycteroperca tigris)
Broomtail grouper (Mycteroperca xenarcha)
Pacific creole-fish (Paranthias colonus)
Creole-fish (Paranthias furcifer)
Bar-cheeked trout (Plectropomus maculatus)
Oval grouper (Triso dermopterus)
White-edged lyre tail (Variola albimarginata)
Yellow-edged lyretail (Variola louti)

Eleotrids 

Bostrychus africanus
Four-eyed sleeper (Bostrychus sinensis)
Green-backed gudgeon (Bunaka gyrinoides)
Ambon gudgeon (Butis amboinensis)
Crazy fish (Butis butis)
Tailface sleeper (Calumia godeffroyi)
Pacific fat sleeper (Dormitator latifrons)
Sleeper goby (Dormitator lebretonis)
Fat sleeper (Dormitator maculatus)
Spine-cheek gudgeon (Eleotris acanthopoma)
Large-scaled spinycheek sleeper (Eleotris amblyopsis)
Eleotris daganensis
Brown spinecheek gudgeon (Eleotris fusca)
Broadhead sleeper (Eleotris melanosoma)
Eleotris oxycephala
Eleotris perniger
Spotted sleeper (Eleotris picta)
Spinycheek sleeper (Eleotris pisonis)
Eleotris senegalensis
Eleotris vittata
Emerald sleeper (Erotelis smaragdus)
Snakehead gudgeon (Giuris margaritacea)
Tarndale bully (Gobiomorphus alpinus)
Cran's bully (Gobiomorphus basalis)
Upland bully (Gobiomorphus breviceps)
Common bully (Gobiomorphus cotidianus)
Giant bully (Gobiomorphus gobioides)
Bigmouth sleeper (Gobiomorus dormitor)
Gobiomorus maculatus
Guavina (Guavina guavina)
Golden gudgeon (Hypseleotris aurea)
Hypseleotris compressocephalus
Kribia kribensis
Kribia nana
Kribia uellensis
Freshwater sleeper goby (Leptophilypnus fluviatilis)
Kokoda mogurnda (Mogurnda lineata)
Eastern mogurnda (Mogurnda orientalis)
Spangled gudgeon (Ophiocara porocephala)
Oxyeleotris marmorata

Gobies 

Yellowfin goby (Acanthogobius flavimanus)
Akihito vanuatu
Triplespot shrimpgoby (Amblyeleotris triguttata)
Buan goby (Amblygobius buanensis)
Amblygobius tekomaji
Sabre goby (Antilligobius nikkiae)
Apocryptodon punctatus
Slow goby (Aruma histrio)
Roman nose goby (Awaous acritosus)
Candy cane goby (Awaous flavus)
Awaous grammepomus
Oopu nakea (Awaous guamensis)
Oman sea longsnout goby (Awaous jayakari)
Awaous macrorhynchus
Awaous ocellaris
Racer goby (Babka gymnotrachelus)
Whiskered goby (Barbulifer antennatus)
Barbulifer ceuthoecus
Barbuligobius boehlkei
Bathygobius aeolosoma
Bathygobius andrei
Antilles frillfin (Bathygobius antilliensis)
Bathygobius casamancus
Notchtongue goby (Bathygobius curacao)
Brown frillfin (Bathygobius fuscus)
Checkerboard frillfin goby (Bathygobius lacertus)
Island frillfin (Bathygobius mystacium)
Panamic frillfin (Bathygobius ramosus)
Frillfin goby (Bathygobius soporator)
Don tadpole-goby (Benthophilus durrelli)
Granular pugolovka (Benthophilus granulosus)
Caspian stellate tadpole-goby (Benthophilus leobergius)
Caspian tadpole goby (Benthophilus macrocephalus)
Azov tadpole goby (Benthophilus magistri)
Small-spine tadpole-goby (Benthophilus mahmudbejovi)
Black Sea tadpole-goby (Benthophilus nudus)
Stellate tadpole-goby (Benthophilus stellatus)
Boddart's goggle-eyed goby (Boleophthalmus boddarti)
White-eye goby (Bollmannia boqueronensis)
Bollmannia chlamydes
Ragged goby (Bollmannia communis)
Shelf goby (Bollmannia eigenmanni)
Citrine goby (Bollmannia litura)
Bumblebee goby (Brachygobius doriae)
Kabili bumblebee goby (Brachygobius kabiliensis)
Mekong dwarf goby (Brachygobius mekongensis)
Brachygobius xanthomelas
Gorgonian goby (Bryaninops amplus)
De Buen's goby (Buenia affinis)
Jeffrey's goby (Buenia jeffreysii)
Saddled goby (Callogobius clitellus)
Scaleless worm goby (Caragobius urolepis)
Caspiosoma caspium
Chaenogobius annularis
Thread-spined goby (Chriolepis bilix)
Translucent goby (Chriolepis fisheri)
Wasp goby (Chriolepis vespa)
Gecko goby (Chriolepis zebra)
Brito's goby (Chromogobius britoi)
Chestnut goby (Chromogobius quadrivittatus)
Kolombatovic's goby (Chromogobius zebratus)
Liechtenstein's goby (Corcyrogobius liechtensteini)
Colon goby (Coryphopterus dicrus)
Coryphopterus glaucofraenum
Coryphopterus punctipectophorus
Redlight goby (Coryphopterus urospilus)
Burrowing goby (Croilia mossambica)
Crystal goby (Crystallogobius linearis)
Darter goby (Ctenogobius boleosoma)
Blotchcheek goby (Ctenogobius fasciatus)
Ctenogobius lepturus
Mangrove goby (Ctenogobius manglicola)
Impostor goby (Ctenogobius phenacus)
Slashcheek goby (Ctenogobius pseudofasciatus)
Dash goby (Ctenogobius saepepallens)
Ctenogobius sagittula
American freshwater goby (Ctenogobius shufeldti)
Emerald goby (Ctenogobius smaragdus)
Marked goby (Ctenogobius stigmaticus)
Spottail goby (Ctenogobius stigmaturus)
Sperm goby (Ctenogobius thoropsis)
Toothed goby (Deltentosteus collonianus)
Didogobius kochi
Didogobius schlieweni
Splechtna's goby (Didogobius splechtnai)
Didogobius wirtzi
Bighead goby (Drombus globiceps)
Hale's drombus (Drombus halei)
Economidichthys pygmaeus
Shortstripe goby (Elacatinus chancei)
Belize sponge goby (Elacatinus colini)
Banded cleaner goby (Elacatinus digueti)
Sharknose goby (Elacatinus evelynae)
Cleaner goby (Elacatinus genie)
Yellowline goby (Elacatinus horsti)
Barsnout goby (Elacatinus illecebrosus)
Inornate goby (Elacatinus inornatus)
Spotback goby (Elacatinus janssi)
Linesnout goby (Elacatinus lori)
Spotlight goby (Elacatinus louisae)
Northern neon goby (Elacatinus oceanops)
Redhead goby (Elacatinus puncticulatus)
Yellownose goby (Elacatinus randalli)
Serranilla goby (Elacatinus serranilla)
Slaty goby (Elacatinus tenox)
Yellowprow goby (Elacatinus xanthiprora)
Silt goby (Enypnias seminudus)
Eugnathogobius illotus
Eugnathogobius kabilia
Eugnathogobius mindora
Eugnathogobius siamensis
Eugnathogobius variegatus
Bandedtail goby (Evermannia zosterura)
Roughtail goby (Evermannichthys metzelaari)
Evermannichthys spongicola
Belly-spotted pygmy-goby (Eviota storthynx)
Lyre goby (Evorthodus lyricus)
Small goby (Evorthodus minutus)
Puntang goby (Exyrias puntang)
Exquisite sand-goby (Favonigobius exquisitus)
Steinitz's goby (Gammogobius steinitzi)
Longjaw mudsucker (Gillichthys mirabilis)
Nineline goby (Ginsburgellus novemlineatus)
Golden flathead goby (Glossogobius aureus)
Bearded flathead goby (Glossogobius bicirrhosus)
River goby (Glossogobius callidus)
Tank goby (Glossogobius giuris)
Glossogobius olivaceus
Eyebar goby (Gnatholepis cauerensis)
Goldspot goby (Gnatholepis thompsoni)
Actor coral goby (Gobiodon histrio)
Gobioides africanus
Violet goby (Gobioides broussonnetii)
Peruvian eelgoby (Gobioides peruanus)
Gobioides sagitta
Estuary goby (Gobionellus microdon)
Gobionellus occidentalis
Highfin goby (Gobionellus oceanicus)
Gobiopterus mindanensis
Naked goby (Gobiosoma bosc)
Sonora goby (Gobiosoma chiquita)
Seaboard goby (Gobiosoma ginsburgi)
Rockcut goby (Gobiosoma grosvenori)
Twoscale goby (Gobiosoma longipala)
Paradox goby (Gobiosoma paradoxum)
Code goby (Gobiosoma robustum)
Vermiculated goby (Gobiosoma spes)
Yucatan goby (Gobiosoma yucatanum)
Bellotti's goby (Gobius ater)
Gobius ateriformis
Golden goby (Gobius auratus)
Bucchich's goby (Gobius bucchichi)
Couch's goby (Gobius couchi)
Red-mouthed goby (Gobius cruentatus)
Sarato's goby (Gobius fallax)
Steven's goby (Gobius gasteveni)
Slender goby (Gobius geniporus)
Gobius hypselosoma
Gobius kolombatovici
Black goby (Gobius niger)
Rock goby (Gobius paganellus)
Roule's goby (Gobius roulei)
Gobius rubropunctatus
Gobius senegambiensis
Striped goby (Gobius vittatus)
Yellow-headed goby (Gobius xanthocephalus)
Two-spotted goby (Gobiusculus flavescens)
Crescent goby (Gobulus crescentalis)
Sandtop goby (Gobulus hancocki)
Paleback goby (Gobulus myersi)
Gorogobius nigricinctus
Splitbanded goby (Gymneleotris seminudus)
Hetereleotris vulgaris
Cheekspot goby (Ilypnus gilberti)
Brown-speckled sand-goby (Istigobius rigilius)
Knipowitschia bergi
Köycegiz naked goby (Knipowitschia byblisia)
Caucasian dwarf goby (Knipowitschia caucasica)
Köycegiz dwarf goby (Knipowitschia caunosi)
Longtail dwarf goby (Knipowitschia longecaudata)
Adriatic dwarf goby (Knipowitschia panizzae)
Guillet's goby (Lebetus guilleti)
Diminutive goby (Lebetus scorpioides)
Lentipes kaaea
Fries's goby (Lesueurigobius friesii)
Lesueurigobius koumansi
Sanzo's goby (Lesueurigobius sanzi)
Lophiogobius ocellicauda
Pacific crested-goby (Lophogobius cristulatus)
Crested goby (Lophogobius cyprinoides)
Mahogany goby (Lythrypnus crocodilus)
Bluebanded goby (Lythrypnus dalli)
Dwarf goby (Lythrypnus elasson)
Diphasic goby (Lythrypnus heterochroma)
Pygmy goby (Lythrypnus minimus)
Bermuda goby (Lythrypnus mowbrayi)
Island goby (Lythrypnus nesiotes)
Okapi goby (Lythrypnus okapia)
Convict goby (Lythrypnus phorellus)
Gorgeous goby (Lythrypnus pulchellus)
Bluegold goby (Lythrypnus spilus)
Lythrypnus zebra
Mauligobius nigri
Toad goby (Mesogobius batrachocephalus)
Balboa goby (Microgobius brevispinis)
Seminole goby (Microgobius carri)
Yellow-spotted goby (Microgobius crocatus)
Low-crested goby (Microgobius curtus)
Roundscale goby (Microgobius cyclolepis)
Emblem goby (Microgobius emblematicus)
Erect goby (Microgobius erectus)
Microgobius gulosus
Meek's goby (Microgobius meeki)
Banner goby (Microgobius microlepis)
Miraflores goby (Microgobius miraflorensis)
Dashback goby (Microgobius signatus)
Taboga goby (Microgobius tabogensis)
Green goby (Microgobius thalassinus)
Large-headed goby (Millerigobius macrocephalus)
Mugilogobius abei
Bandfin mangrove goby (Mugilogobius cavifrons)
Yellowstripe goby (Mugilogobius chulae)
Merton's mangrove goby (Mugilogobius mertoni)
Pacific mangrove goby (Mugilogobius notospilus)
Indonesian goby (Mugilogobius platystomus)
Queen of Siam goby (Mugilogobius rambaiae)
Nematogobius brachynemus
Monkey goby (Neogobius fluviatilis)
Round goby (Neogobius melanostomus)
Neogobius pallasi
Atlantic shrimp goby (Nes longus)
Orange-spotted sand-goby (Nesogobius hinsbyi)
Obliquogobius turkayi
Coralline goby (Odondebuenia balearica)
Kei goby (Oligolepis keiensis)
Oxyurichthys stigmalophius
Padogobius bonelli
Mauve goby (Palatogobius paradoxus)
Mekong rock goby (Papuligobius ocellatus)
Parasicydium bandama
Peppered goby (Pariah scotius)
Lucretia's goby (Parrella lucretiae)
Parrella macropteryx
Doublestripe goby (Parrella maxillaris)
Atlantic mudskipper (Periophthalmus barbarus)
Bath's goby (Pomatoschistus bathi)
Canestrini's goby (Pomatoschistus canestrinii)
Kner's goby (Pomatoschistus knerii)
Lozano's goby (Pomatoschistus lozanoi)
Marbled goby (Pomatoschistus marmoratus)
Common goby (Pomatoschistus microps)
Sand goby (Pomatoschistus minutus)
Skadar goby (Pomatoschistus montenegrensis)
Norway goby (Pomatoschistus norvegicus)
Painted goby (Pomatoschistus pictus)
Quagga goby (Pomatoschistus quagga)
Pinchuk's goby (Ponticola cephalargoides)
Caucasian goby (Ponticola constructor)
Caspian freshwater goby (Ponticola cyrius)
Mushroom goby (Ponticola eurycephalus)
Caspian bighead goby (Ponticola gorlap)
Ponticola kessleri
Flatsnout goby (Ponticola platyrostris)
Syrman goby (Ponticola syrman)
Dawson's goby (Priolepis dawsoni)
Rusty goby (Priolepis hipoliti)
Priolepis robinsi
Tubenose goby (Proterorhinus marmoratus)
Eastern tubenose goby (Proterorhinus nasalis)
Western tubenose goby (Proterorhinus semilunaris)
Sleepy goby (Psammogobius biocellatus)
Ferrer's goby (Pseudaphya ferreri)
Pseudapocryptes elongatus
Pseudogobiopsis oligactis
Northern fatnose goby (Pseudogobius poicilosoma)
Scaleless goby (Psilotris alepis)
Toadfish goby (Psilotris batrachodes)
Highspine goby (Psilotris celsus)
Kaufman's goby (Psilotris kaufmani)
Pterogobius zonoleucus
Roosevelt's goby (Pycnomma roosevelti)
American shadow goby (Quietula y-cauda)
Girdled goby (Redigobius balteatus)
Speckled goby (Redigobius bikolanus)
Redigobius chrysosoma
Checked goby (Redigobius dewaali)
Tambujon goby (Redigobius tambujon)
Barcheek goby (Rhinogobius giurinus)
Rhinogobius leavelli
Rhinogobius mekongianus
Rhinogobius taenigena
Tusked goby (Risor ruber)
Schismatogobius vitiensis
Sicydium crenilabrum
Multispotted goby (Sicydium multipunctatum)
Spotted algae-eating goby (Sicydium punctatum)
Sicyopterus franouxi
Sicyopterus griseus
Sicyopterus lagocephalus
Sicyopterus lividus
Sicyopterus pugnans
Sicyopus nigriradiatus
Sicyopus zosterophorus
Silhouettea aegyptia
Smilosicyopus chloe
Smilosicyopus fehlmanni
Grotto goby (Speleogobius trigloides)
Stenogobius beauforti
Stenogobius fehlmanni
Stenogobius genivittatus
Stenogobius gymnopomus
Stenogobius hoesei
Kenyan river gogy (Stenogobius kenyae)
Stenogobius laterisquamatus
Stenogobius mekongensis
Stenogobius ophthalmoporus
Chinestripe goby (Stenogobius polyzona)
Stenogobius yateiensis
Stigmatogobius sella
Stiphodon atratus
Stiphodon birdsong
Stiphodon caeruleus
Stiphodon elegans
Stiphodon rutilaureus
Stiphodon sapphirinus
Stiphodon tuivi
Thorogobius angolensis
Leopard-spotted goby (Thorogobius ephippiatus)
Large-scaled goby (Thorogobius macrolepis)
Thorogobius rofeni
Orangesided goby (Tigrigobius dilepis)
Frecklefin goby (Tigrigobius gemmatus)
Tigrigobius macrodon
Greenbanded goby (Tigrigobius multifasciatus)
Semiscaled goby (Tigrigobius pallens)
Leopard goby (Tigrigobius saucrus)
Zebrette goby (Tigrigobius zebrellus)
Shimofuri goby (Tridentiger bifasciatus)
Tridentiger kuroiwae
Trimma fraena
Vanneaugobius canariensis
Ratan goby (Vanneaugobius pruvoti)
Wheelerigobius maltzani
Cameroon goby (Wheelerigobius wirtzi)
Yongeichthys thomasi
Zebra goby (Zebrus zebrus)
Grass goby (Zosterisessor ophiocephalus)

Badids 

Badis badis
Badis blosyrus
Badis ferrarisi
Badis khwae
Badis ruber
Dario hysginon

Sparids 

Species

Arabian yellowfin seabream (Acanthopagrus arabicus)
Surf bream (Acanthopagrus australis)
Picnic seabream (Acanthopagrus berda)
Two-bar seabream (Acanthopagrus bifasciatus)
Southern black bream (Acanthopagrus butcheri)
Western yellow-finned bream (Acanthopagrus morrisoni)
Pacific seabream (Acanthopagrus pacificus)
Northwest black bream (Acanthopagrus palmaris)
Japanese black porgy (Acanthopagrus schlegelii)
Spotted yellowfin seabream (Acanthopagrus sheim)
Sheepshead (Archosargus probatocephalus)
Western Atlantic seabream (Archosargus rhomboidalis)
Taiwan tai (Argyrops bleekeri)
Soldierbream (Argyrops filamentosus)
Long spined red bream (Argyrops spinifer)
Bogue (Boops boops)
Fransmadam (Boopsoidea inornata)
Grass porgy (Calamus arctifrons)
Jolthead porgy (Calamus bajonado)
Pacific porgy (Calamus brachysomus)
Saucereye porgy (Calamus calamus)
Spotfin porgy (Calamus cervigoni)
Whitebone porgy (Calamus leucosteus)
Flathead porgy (Calamus mu)
Knobbed porgy (Calamus nodosus)
Sheepshead porgy (Calamus penna)
Pluma porgy (Calamus pennatula)
Littlehead porgy (Calamus proridens)
False red stumpnose (Chrysoblephus lophus)
Slinger seabream (Chrysoblephus puniceus)
Karenteen seabream (Crenidens crenidens)
Crenidens indicus
Dentex abei
Barnard's dentex (Dentex barnardi)
Canary dentex (Dentex canariensis)
Congo dentex (Dentex congoensis)
Pink dentex (Dentex gibbosus)
Dentex hypselosomus
Large-eyed dentex (Dentex macrophthalmus)
Morocco dentex (Dentex maroccanus)
Saffronfin sea bream (Dentex spariformis)
Annular seabream (Diplodus annularis)
South-american silver porgy (Diplodus argenteus)
Senegal seabream (Diplodus bellottii)
Bermuda porgy (Diplodus bermudensis)
Blacktail (Diplodus capensis)
Zebra seabream (Diplodus cervinus)
Banded seabream (Diplodus fasciatus)
Spottail pinfish (Diplodus holbrookii)
Zebra (Diplodus hottentotus)
Red sea seabream (Diplodus noct)
Diplodus omanensis
Diplodus prayensis
Sharpsnout seabream (Diplodus puntazzo)
Sargo (Diplodus sargus)
Common two-banded seabream (Diplodus vulgaris)
Yellowback seabream (Evynnis tumifrons)
Janbruin (Gymnocrotaphus curvidens)
Salt-water bream (Lagodon rhomboides)
Sand steenbras (Lithognathus mormyrus)
Saddled seabream (Oblada melanura)
Pachymetopon aeneum
Hottentot seabream (Pachymetopon blochii)
Axillary seabream (Pagellus acarne)
Arabian pandora (Pagellus affinis)
Red pandora (Pagellus bellottii)
Common pandora (Pagellus erythrinus)
Natal pandora (Pagellus natalensis)
African red bream (Pagrus africanus)
Australasian snapper (Pagrus auratus)
Red-banded sea bream (Pagrus auriga)
Goldenhead porgy (Pagrus caeruleostictus)
Red seabream snapper (Pagrus major)
Red porgy (Pagrus pagrus)
German seabream (Polyamblyodon germanum)
Knife-back seabream (Polyamblyodon gibbosum)
Frenchman seabream (Polysteganus baissaci)
Dane seabream (Porcostoma dentata)
Panga (Pterogymnus laniarius)
Haffara seabream (Rhabdosargus haffara)
Cape stumpnose (Rhabdosargus holubi)
Goldlined seabream (Rhabdosargus sarba)
Bigeye stumpnose (Rhabdosargus thorpei)
Salema porgy (Sarpa salpa)
Sobaity seabream (Sparidentex hasta)
Gilt-head bream (Sparus aurata)
Black seabream (Spondyliosoma cantharus)
Steentjie (Spondyliosoma emarginatum)
Longspine porgy (Stenotomus caprinus)
Bulldog dentex (Virididentex acromegalus)

Subspecies

White bream (Diplodus argenteus argenteus)
Roundspot porgy (Diplodus argenteus caudimacula)
Diplodus sargus ascensionis
Moroccan white seabream (Diplodus sargus cadenati)
St. Helena white seabream (Diplodus sargus helenae)
One spot seabream (Diplodus sargus kotschyi)
Diplodus sargus lineatus
Diplodus sargus sargus

Scombrids 

Wahoo (Acanthocybium solandri)
Slender tuna (Allothunnus fallai)
Firgate tuna (Auxis rochei)
Leadenall (Auxis thazard)
Leaping bonito (Cybiosarda elegans)
Kawakawa (Euthynnus affinis)
Little tunny (Euthynnus alletteratus)
Euthynnus lineatus
Butterfly kingfish (Gasterochisma melampus)
Shark mackerel (Grammatorcynus bicarinatus)
Double-lined mackerel (Grammatorcynus bilineatus)
Dogtooth tuna (Gymnosarda unicolor)
Skipjack tuna (Katsuwonus pelamis)
Plain bonito (Orcynopsis unicolor)
Australian bonito (Sarda australis)
Sarda chiliensis
Striped bonito (Sarda orientalis)
Atlantic bonito (Sarda sarda)
Blue mackerel (Scomber australasicus)
Atlantic chub mackerel (Scomber colias)
Chub mackerel (Scomber japonicus)
Atlantic mackerel (Scomber scombrus)
Serra Spanish mackerel (Scomberomorus brasiliensis)
King mackerel (Scomberomorus cavalla)
Korean mackerel (Scomberomorus koreanus)
Streaked Spanish mackerel (Scomberomorus lineolatus)
Atlantic Spanish mackerel (Scomberomorus maculatus)
Papuan seerfish (Scomberomorus multiradiatus)
Queensland school mackerel (Scomberomorus queenslandicus)
Cero (Scomberomorus regalis)
Broadbarred king mackerel (Scomberomorus semifasciatus)
Pacific sierra (Scomberomorus sierra)
West African Spanish mackerel (Scomberomorus tritor)
Blackfin tuna (Thunnus atlanticus)

Dragonets 

Lancer dragonet (Callionymus bairdi)
Banded dragonet (Callionymus fasciatus)
Common dragonet (Callionymus lyra)
Spotted dragonet (Callionymus maculatus)
Sailfin dragonet (Callionymus pusillus)
Reticulated dragonet (Callionymus reticulatus)
Risso’s dragonet (Callionymus risso)
Arrow dragonet (Callionymus sagitta)
Diplogrammus pauciradiatus
Shango dragonet (Draculo shango)
Spotfin dragonet (Foetorepus agassizii)
Palefin dragonet (Foetorepus goodenbeani)
Antler dragonet (Synchiropus atrilabiatus)
Claudia's dragonet (Synchiropus claudiae)
Dagmar's dragonet (Synchiropus dagmarae)
Werstern Australian bigeye dragonet (Synchiropus grandoculis)
Phaeton dragonet (Synchiropus phaeton)
Tonlesapia amnica

Lutjanids 

Apsilus dentatus
African forktail snapper (Apsilus fuscus)
Mexican barred snapper (Hoplopagrus guentherii)
Schoolmaster snapper (Lutjanus apodus)
Lutjanus aratus
Amarillo snapper (Lutjanus argentiventris)
Lutjanus colorado
Checkered seaperch (Lutjanus decussatus)
Golden African snapper (Lutjanus fulgens)
Mangrove snapper (Lutjanus griseus)
Rose snapper (Lutjanus guttatus)
Lutjanus inermis
Rufous snapper (Lutjanus jordani)
Mahogany snapper (Lutjanus mahogoni)
Bluestriped snapper (Lutjanus notatus)
Pacific Cubera snapper (Lutjanus novemfasciatus)
Pacific red snapper (Lutjanus peru)
Blue and gold snapper (Lutjanus viridis)
Silk snapper (Lutjanus vivanus)
Pristipomoides aquilonaris
Slender wenchman (Pristipomoides freemani)
Cardinal snapper (Pristipomoides macrophthalmus)

Sand stargazers 

Giant sand stargazer (Dactylagnus mundus)
Panamic stargazer (Dactylagnus parvus)
Riverine stargazer (Dactyloscopus amnis)
Dactyloscopus boehlkei
Notchtail stargazer (Dactyloscopus byersi)
Ornamented stargazer (Dactyloscopus comptus)
Bigeye stargazer (Dactyloscopus crossotus)
Dactyloscopus elongatus
Dactyloscopus fallax
Fringed stargazer (Dactyloscopus fimbriatus)
Reticulate stargazer (Dactyloscopus foraminosus)
Dactyloscopus heraldi
Moonstruck stargazer (Dactyloscopus lunaticus)
Mexican stargazer (Dactyloscopus metoecus)
Tiny stargazer (Dactyloscopus minutus)
Speckled stargazer (Dactyloscopus moorei)
Whitesaddle stargazer (Dactyloscopus pectoralis)
Dactyloscopus poeyi
Dactyloscopus tridigitatus
Sandy stargazer (Gillellus arenicola)
Gillellus greyae
Masked stargazer (Gillellus healae)
Jackson's stargazer (Gillellus jacksoni)
Ornate stargazer (Gillellus ornatus)
Searcher stargazer (Gillellus searcheri)
Half-banded stargazer (Gillellus semicinctus)
Warteye stargazer (Gillellus uranidea)
Banded stargazer (Heteristius cinctus)
Smoothlip stargazer (Leurochilus acon)
Myxodagnus macrognathus
Dart stargazer (Myxodagnus opercularis)
Myxodagnus walkeri
Brazilian sand stargazer (Platygillellus brasiliensis)
Saddle stargazer (Platygillellus rubrocinctus)
Sindoscopus australis
Storrsia olsoni

Tilefishes 

Red tilefish (Branchiostegus japonicus)
Zebra tilefish (Branchiostegus semifasciatus)
Bighead tilefish (Caulolatilus affinis)
Goldface tilefish (Caulolatilus chrysops)
Blackline tilefish (Caulolatilus cyanops)
Reticulated tilefish (Caulolatilus guppyi)
Hubbs' tilefish (Caulolatilus hubbsi)
Gulf bareye tilefish (Caulolatilus intermedius)
Ocean whitefish (Caulolatilus princeps)
Yellow-spotted tilefish (Hoplolatilus fourmanoiri)
Sand tilefish (Malacanthus plumieri)

Anabantidae 

Leopard bush fish (Ctenopoma acutirostre)
Tailspot ctenopoma (Ctenopoma kingsleyae)
Ctenopoma machadoi
Ctenopoma maculatum
Many spined climbing perch (Ctenopoma multispine)
Ocellated labyrinth fish (Ctenopoma muriei)
Twospot climbing perch (Ctenopoma nigropannosum)
Eyespot ctenopoma (Ctenopoma ocellatum)
Ctenopoma petherici
Mottled ctenopoma (Ctenopoma weeksii)
Orange ctenopoma (Microctenopoma ansorgii)
Congo ctenopoma (Microctenopoma congicum)
Microctenopoma damasi
Banded ctenopoma (Microctenopoma fasciolatum)
Microctenopoma intermedium
Dwarf ctenopoma (Microctenopoma nanum)
Microctenopoma nigricans
Microctenopoma ocellifer
Microctenopoma uelense

Pomacentrids 

Dusky sergeant (Abudefduf concolor)
Mexican night sergeant (Abudefduf declivifrons)
Canary damsel (Abudefduf luridus)
Sergeant major (Abudefduf saxatilis)
Dovetail (Abudefduf taurus)
Panama sergeant major (Abudefduf troschelii)
Orange skunk clownfish (Amphiprion sandaracinos)
Yellow-speckled chromis (Chromis alpha)
Oval chromis (Chromis alta)
Scissortail damselfish (Chromis atrilobata)
Chromis bermudae
Cadenat's chromis (Chromis cadenati)
Mediterranean chromis (Chromis chromis)
Valparaiso chromis (Chromis crusma)
Blue chromis (Chromis cyanea)
Yellowtail reeffish (Chromis enchrysura)
Sunshinefish (Chromis insolata)
Peruvian chromis (Chromis intercrusma)
Azores chromis (Chromis limbata)
Blue-and-yellow chromis (Chromis limbaughi)
Lubbock's chromis (Chromis lubbocki)
Brown chromis (Chromis multilineata)
Pemba chromis (Chromis pembae)
Blacksmith chromis (Chromis punctipinnis)
St. Helena chromis (Chromis sanctaehelenae)
Purple reeffish (Chromis scotti)
Yellowfin damselfish (Chrysiptera flavipinnis)
Cape damsel (Chrysiptera unimaculata)
Garibaldi (Hypsypops rubicundus)
Bumphead damselfish (Microspathodon bairdii)
Yellowtail damselfish (Microspathodon chrysurus)
Giant damselfish (Microspathodon dorsalis)
Guinea damselfish (Microspathodon frontatus)
Chinese damsel (Neopomacentrus bankieri)
Coquito sergeant (Nexilosus latifrons)
Victorian scalyfin (Parma victoriae)
Blue-green damselfish (Pomacentrus callainus)
Miller's damselfish (Pomacentrus milleri)
Smith's damsel (Pomacentrus smithi)
Ward's damsel (Pomacentrus wardi)
Acapulco damselfish (Stegastes acapulcoensis)
Dusky damselfish (Stegastes adustus)
Island major (Stegastes arcifrons)
Longfin damselfish (Stegastes diencaeus)
Beaubrummel (Stegastes flavilatus)
Demoiselle (Stegastes fuscus)
Coral Sea gregory (Stegastes gascoynei)
Cape Verde gregory (Stegastes imbricatus)
Beaugregory (Stegastes leucostictus)
Stegastes lubbocki
Bicolor damselfish (Stegastes partitus)
Threespot damselfish (Stegastes planifrons)
Cortez damselfish (Stegastes rectifraenum)
Stegastes sanctaehelenae
Saint Paul's gregory (Stegastes sanctipauli)
Cocoa damselfish (Stegastes xanthurus)
Jordan's damsel (Teixeirichthys jordani)

Sciaenids 

Freshwater drum (Aplodinotus grunniens)
Meagre (Argyrosomus regius)
White seabass (Atractoscion nobilis)
Armed croaker (Bairdiella armata)
American silver perch (Bairdiella chrysoura)
Swordpsine croaker (Bairdiella ensifera)
Bairdiella (Bairdiella icistia)
Ground croaker (Bairdiella ronchus)
Blue croaker (Corvula batabana)
Striped croaker (Corvula sanctaeluciae)
Barbel drum (Ctenosciaena gracilicirrhus)
Acoupa weakfish (Cynoscion acoupa)
Peruvian weakfish (Cynoscion analis)
Sand seatrout (Cynoscion arenarius)
Jamaican weakfish (Cynoscion jamaicensis)
Smooth weakfish (Cynoscion leiarchus)
Smallscale weakfish (Cynoscion microlepidotus)
Dwarf weakfish (Cynoscion nannus)
Spotted weakfish (Cynoscion nebulosus)
Silver seatrout (Cynoscion nothus)
Cachema weakfish (Cynoscion phoxocephalus)
Striped corvina (Cynoscion reticulatus)
Tonkin weakfish (Cynoscion similis)
Scalyfin corvina (Cynoscion squamipinnis)
Smalltooth weakfish (Cynoscion steindachneri)
Pelano weakfish (Cynoscion stolzmanni)
Green weakfish (Cynoscion virescens)
Bluestreak drum (Elattarchus archidium)
Jack-knifefish (Equetus lanceolatus)
Spotted drum (Equetus punctatus)
Bigtooth corvina (Isopisthus parvipinnis)
Bigeye corvina (Isopisthus remifer)
Big-eyed jewfish (Johnius coitor)
Paperhead croaker (Johnius novaeguineae)
Steeplined drum (Larimus acclivis)
Silver drum (Larimus argenteus)
Shorthead drum (Larimus breviceps)
Shining drum (Larimus effulgens)
Larimus fasciatus
Pacific drum (Larimus pacificus)
Spot (Leiostomus xanthurus)
Longtail croaker (Lonchurus lanceolatus)
King weakfish (Macrodon ancylodon)
Southern kingfish (Menticirrhus americanus)
Pacific kingcroaker (Menticirrhus elongatus)
Gulf kingfish (Menticirrhus littoralis)
Berrugato real (Menticirrhus nasus)
Snakehead kingcroaker (Menticirrhus ophicephalus)
Paita kingcroaker (Menticirrhus paitensis)
Berrugato panameño (Menticirrhus panamensis)
Northern kingcroaker (Menticirrhus saxatilis)
Tallfin croaker (Micropogonias altipinnis)
Slender croaker (Micropogonias ectenes)
Whitemouth croaker (Micropogonias furnieri)
Chano norteño (Micropogonias megalops)
Atlantic croaker (Micropogonias undulatus)
Angola croaker (Miracorvina angolensis)
Smalleye croaker (Nebris microps)
Pacific smalleye croaker (Nebris occidentalis)
Reef croaker (Odontoscion dentex)
Yelloweye croaker (Odontoscion xanthops)
Blinkard croaker (Ophioscion imiceps)
Impostor drum (Ophioscion punctatissimus)
Point-tuza croaker (Ophioscion scierus)
Snub-nosed croaker (Ophioscion simulus)
Squint-eyed croaker (Ophioscion strabo)
Point-nosed croaker (Ophioscion typicus)
Vermiculated croaker (Ophioscion vermicularis)
Banded croaker (Paralonchurus brasiliensis)
Suco croaker (Paralonchurus dumerilii)
Angel croaker (Paralonchurus goodei)
Coco croaker (Paralonchurus peruanus)
Peters' banded croaker (Paralonchurus petersii)
Bearded banded croaker (Paralonchurus rathbuni)
High-hat (Pareques acuminatus)
Festive drum (Pareques fuscovittatus)
Blackbar drum (Pareques iwamotoi)
Royal highhat (Pareques lanfeari)
Chubbuyu (Pareques umbrosus)
Gungo highhat (Pareques viola)
Black drum (Pogonias cromis)
Deep-water drum (Protosciaena bathytatos)
New grenada drum (Protosciaena trewavasae)
Bobo croaker (Pseudotolithus elongatus)
Guinea croaker (Pseudotolithus epipercus)
Cameroon croaker (Pseudotolithus moorii)
Longneck croaker (Pseudotolithus typus)
Boe drum (Pteroscion peli)
Blotched tiger-toothed croaker (Pterotolithus maculatus)
Spotfin croaker (Roncador stearnsii)
Sciaena deliciosa
Sciaena fasciata
Red drum (Sciaenops ocellatus)
Queenfish (Seriphus politus)
Chao stardrum (Stellifer chaoi)
Shortnose stardrum (Stellifer chrysoleuca)
Colon stardrum (Stellifer colonensis)
Stellifer ephelis
Hollow stardrum (Stellifer ericymba)
White stardrum (Stellifer fuerthii)
Gray stardrum (Stellifer griseus)
Silver stardrum (Stellifer illecebrosus)
American stardrum (Stellifer lanceolatus)
Smooth stardrum (Stellifer mancorensis)
Black stardrum (Stellifer melanocheir)
Smalleye stardrum (Stellifer microps)
Stellifer minor
Naso stardrum (Stellifer naso)
Yawning stardrum (Stellifer oscitans)
Pizzaro stardrum (Stellifer pizarroensis)
Rake stardrum (Stellifer rastrifer)
Venezuelan stardrum (Stellifer venezuelae)
Softhead stardrum (Stellifer zestocarus)
Longspine croaker (Umbrina analis)
Beach drum (Umbrina broussonnetii)
Bussing's drum (Umbrina bussingi)
Canary drum (Umbrina canariensis)
Sand drum (Umbrina coroides)
Longfin croaker (Umbrina dorsalis)
Miller drum (Umbrina milliae)
Umbrina reedi
Yellowfin croaker (Umbrina roncador)
Common yellowtail croaker (Umbrina xanti)

Threadfins 

Blue bobo (Polydactylus approximans)
Small-mouthed threadfin (Polydactylus microstomus)
Australian threadfin (Polydactylus multiradiatus)
Atlantic threadfin (Polydactylus octonemus)
Littlescale threadfin (Polydactylus oligodon)
Yellow bobo (Polydactylus opercularis)
Persian blackspot threadfin (Polydactylus persicus)
Giant African threadfin (Polydactylus quadrifilis)
Sevenfingered threadfin (Polydactylus virginicus)
Polynemus aquilonaris
Blackhand paradise fish (Polynemus melanochir)

Centrarchids 

Mud sunfish (Acantharchus pomotis)
Shadow bass (Ambloplites ariommus)
Roanoke bass (Ambloplites cavifrons)
Ozark bass (Ambloplites constellatus)
Rock bass (Ambloplites rupestris)
Flier (Centrarchus macropterus)
Bluespotted sunfish (Enneacanthus gloriosus)
Banded sunfish (Enneacanthus obesus)
Redbreast sunfish (Lepomis auritus)
Green sunfish (Lepomis cyanellus)
Pumpkinseed (Lepomis gibbosus)
Warmouth (Lepomis gulosus)
Orangespotted sunfish (Lepomis humilis)
Bluegill (Lepomis macrochirus)
Dollar sunfish (Lepomis marginatus)
Longear sunfish (Lepomis megalotis)
Redear sunfish (Lepomis microlophus)
Redspotted sunfish (Lepomis miniatus)
Spotted sunfish (Lepomis punctatus)
Bantam sunfish (Lepomis symmetricus)
Redeye bass (Micropterus coosae)
Smallmouth bass (Micropterus dolomieu)
Alabama bass (Micropterus henshalli)
Spotted bass (Micropterus punctulatus)
Largemouth bass (Micropterus salmoides)
White crappie (Pomoxis annularis)
Black crappie (Pomoxis nigromaculatus)

Snakeheads 

Borna snakehead (Channa amphibeus)
Small snakehead (Channa asiatica)
Channa burmanica
Dwarf snakehead (Channa gachua)
Forest snakehead (Channa lucius)
Blotched snakehead (Channa maculata)
Emperor snakehead (Channa marulioides)
Channa marulius
Black snakehead (Channa melasoma)
Giant snakehead (Channa micropeltes)
Channa panaw
Channa punctata
Channa stewartii
Snakehead murrel (Channa striata)
Parachanna africana
Parachanna insignis

Labrisomids 

Island kelpfish (Alloclinus holderi)
Auchenionchus crinitus
Auchenionchus microcirrhis
Auchenionchus variolosus
Whitecheek blenny (Brockius albigenys)
Spotcheek blenny (Brockius nigricinctus)
Green blenny (Brockius striatus)
Calliclinus geniguttatus
Calliclinus nudiventris
Deepwater blenny (Cryptotrema corallinum)
Foureye rockskipper (Dialommus macrocephalus)
Sargassum blenny (Exerpes asper)
Puffcheek blenny (Gobioclinus bucciferus)
Quillfin blenny (Gobioclinus filamentosus)
Goggle eye blenny (Gobioclinus gobio)
Gobioclinus guppyi
Longfin blenny (Gobioclinus haitiensis)
Downy blenny (Gobioclinus kalisherae)
Masquerader hairy blenny (Labrisomus conditus)
Mock blenny (Labrisomus cricota)
Labrisomus fernandezianus
Porehead blenny (Labrisomus multiporosus)
Hairy blenny (Labrisomus nuchipinnis)
Chalapo clinid (Labrisomus philippii)
Largemouth blenny (Labrisomus xanti)
Goldline blenny (Malacoctenus aurolineatus)
Diamond blenny (Malacoctenus boehlkei)
Delalande blenny (Malacoctenus delalandii)
Fishgod blenny (Malacoctenus ebisui)
Malacoctenus erdmani
Sonora blenny (Malacoctenus gigas)
Malacoctenus gilli
Redside blenny (Malacoctenus hubbsi)
Rosy blenny (Malacoctenus macropus)
Margarita blenny (Malacoctenus margaritae)
Malacoctenus mexicanus
Malacoctenus polyporosus
Malacoctenus sudensis
Chameleon clinid (Malacoctenus tetranemus)
Malacoctenus triangulatus
Barfin blenny (Malacoctenus versicolor)
Zaca blenny (Malacoctenus zacae)
Glossy blenny (Malacoctenus zonifer)
Threadfin blenny (Nemaclinus atelestos)
Paraclinus arcanus
Goatee blenny (Paraclinus barbatus)
Pink blenny (Paraclinus beebei)
Paraclinus cingulatus
Paraclinus fasciatus
Paraclinus grandicomis
Bald blenny (Paraclinus infrons)
Reef finspot (Paraclinus integripinnis)
Marbled blenny (Paraclinus marmoratus)
Mexican blenny (Paraclinus mexicanus)
One-eyed blenny (Paraclinus monophthalmus)
Surf blenny (Paraclinus naeorhegmis)
Paraclinus nigripinnis
Paraclinus rubicundus
Flapscale blenny (Paraclinus sini)
Paraclinus spectator
Professor blenny (Paraclinus stephensi)
Paraclinus tanygnathus
Smooth-eye blenny (Starksia atlantica)
Starksia brasiliensis
Fugitive blenny (Starksia cremnobates)
Culebra blenny (Starksia culebrae)
Elongate blenny (Starksia elongata)
Blackbar blenny (Starksia fasciata)
Yellow blenny (Starksia fulva)
Pinstriped blenny (Starksia grammilaga)
Starksia greenfieldi
Guadalupe blenny (Starksia guadalupae)
Spotted blenny (Starksia guttata)
Ringed blenny (Starksia hassi)
Starksia langi
Blackcheek blenny (Starksia lepicoelia)
Black spot blenny (Starksia melasma)
Manyscaled blenny (Starksia multilepis)
Starksia nanodes
Occidental blenny (Starksia occidentalis)
Checkered blenny (Starksia ocellata)
Tawny blenny (Starksia rava)
Robertson's blenny (Starksia robertsoni)
Sangrey's blenny (Starksia sangreyae)
Chessboard blenny (Starksia sluiteri)
Brokenbar blenny (Starksia smithvanizi)
Phallic blenny (Starksia spinipenis)
Key blenny (Starksia starcki)
Weigt's blenny (Starksia weigti)
Williams's blenny (Starksia williamsi)
Redrump blenny (Xenomedea rhodopyga)

Serranids 

Eastern wirrah (Acanthistius ocellatus)
Peruvian seabass (Acanthistius pictus)
Swallowtail seaperch (Anthias anthias)
Yellowfin bass (Anthias nicholsi)
Swallowtail bass (Anthias woodsi)
Streamer bass (Baldwinella aureorubens)
Red barbier (Baldwinella vivanus)
Pugnose bass (Bullisichthys caribbaeus)
Twospot sea bass (Centropristis fuscula)
Bank sea bass (Centropristis ocyurus)
Centropristis philadelphica
Black sea bass (Centropristis striata)
Choranthias salmopunctatus
Threadnose bass (Choranthias tenuis)
Dwarf sand perch (Diplectrum bivittatum)
Diplectrum conceptione
Orange-spotted sand perch (Diplectrum eumelum)
Bighead sand perch (Diplectrum euryplectrum)
Diplectrum formosum
Highfin sand perch (Diplectrum labarum)
Mexican sand perch (Diplectrum macropoma)
Greater sand perch (Diplectrum maximum)
Inshore sand perch (Diplectrum pacificum)
Pond perch (Diplectrum radiale)
Bridled sand perch (Diplectrum rostrum)
Gulf squirrelfish (Diplectrum sciurus)
Longtail bass (Hemanthias leptus)
Rose thread-fin bass (Hemanthias peruanus)
Damsel bass (Hemanthias signifer)
Yellowbelly hamlet (Hypoplectrus aberrans)
Yellowtail hamlet (Hypoplectrus chlorurus)
Florida barred hamlet (Hypoplectrus floridae)
Blue hamlet (Hypoplectrus gemma)
Golden hamlet (Hypoplectrus gummigutta)
Shy hamlet (Hypoplectrus guttavarius)
Indigo hamlet (Hypoplectrus indigo)
Black hamlet (Hypoplectrus nigricans)
Masked hamlet (Hypoplectrus providencianus)
Barred hamlet (Hypoplectrus puella)
Tan hamlet (Hypoplectrus randallorum)
Butter hamlet (Hypoplectrus unicolor)
Western orange perch (Lepidoperca filamenta)
Eyestripe bass (Liopropoma aberrans)
Candy basslet (Liopropoma carmabi)
Wrasse bass (Liopropoma eukrines)
Rainbow basslet (Liopropoma fasciatum)
Cave bass (Liopropoma mowbrayi)
Peppermint bass (Liopropoma rubre)
Earle's splitfin (Luzonichthys earlei)
Luzonichthys williamsi
Odontanthias tapui
Kelp Bass (Paralabrax clathratus)
Vieja parrot rock-bass (Paralabrax dewegeri)
Spotted sand bass (Paralabrax maculatofasciatus)
Barred sand bass (Paralabrax nebulifer)
Bank bass (Parasphyraenops atrimanus)
Forktailed bass (Parasphyraenops incisus)
Plectranthias bauchotae
Plectranthias bilaticlavia
Apricot bass (Plectranthias garrupellus)
Roughtongue bass (Pronotogrammus martinicensis)
Threadfin bass (Pronotogrammus multifasciatus)
Pseudanthias caudalis
Nusa Penida basslet (Pseudanthias cichlops)
Flame anthias (Pseudanthias ignitus)
Painted anthias (Pseudanthias pictilis)
Mirror basslet (Pseudanthias pleurotaenia)
Pseudanthias ventralis
Reef bass (Pseudogramma gregoryi)
Pseudogramma guineensis
Pacific reef bass (Pseudogramma thaumasium)
Flathead perch (Rainfordia opercularis)
Mottled soapfish (Rypticus bicolor)
Freckled soapfish (Rypticus bistrispinus)
Largespotted soapfish (Rypticus bornoi)
Slope soapfish (Rypticus carpenteri)
Whitespotted soapfish (Rypticus maculatus)
Blackfin soapfish (Rypticus nigripinnis)
Plain soapfish (Rypticus randalli)
Greater soapfish (Rypticus saponaceus)
Spotted soapfish (Rypticus subbifrenatus)
School bass (Schultzea beta)
Pygmy sea bass (Serraniculus pumilio)
Serranus accraensis
Deepwater serrano (Serranus aequidens)
Serranus africanus
Orangeback bass (Serranus annularis)
Blackear bass (Serranus atrobranchus)
Lantern bass (Serranus baldwini)
Comber (Serranus cabrilla)
Caribbean snow bass (Serranus chionaraia)
Twinspot bass (Serranus flaviventris)
Brown comber (Serranus hepatus)
Serranus heterurus
Flag serrano (Serranus huascarii)
Crosshatch bass (Serranus luciopercanus)
Pallid bass (Serranus maytagi)
Saddle bass (Serranus notospilus)
Tattler (Serranus phoebe)
Barred serrano (Serranus psittacinus)
Serranus sanctaehelenae
Painted comber (Serranus scriba)
Serranus stilbostigma
Belted sandfish (Serranus subligarius)
Tobacco basslet (Serranus tabacarius)
Cocos serrano (Serranus tico)
Harlequin bass (Serranus tigrinus)
Chalk bass (Serranus tortugarum)

Chaenopsids 

Roughhead blenny (Acanthemblemaria aspera)
Clubhead barnacle blenny (Acanthemblemaria balanorum)
Speckled blenny (Acanthemblemaria betinensis)
Papillose blenny (Acanthemblemaria chaplini)
Browncheek blenny (Acanthemblemaria crockeri)
Bluntspine blenny (Acanthemblemaria exilispinus)
Stalk blenny (Acanthemblemaria greenfieldi)
Hancock's blenny (Acanthemblemaria hancocki)
Acanthemblemaria hastingsi
White-cheeked blenny (Acanthemblemaria johnsoni)
Mexican barnacle blenny (Acanthemblemaria macrospilus)
Secretary blenny (Acanthemblemaria maria)
Medusa blenny (Acanthemblemaria medusa)
Spotjaw blenny (Acanthemblemaria rivasi)
Spinyhead blenny (Acanthemblemaria spinosa)
Orangethroat pikeblenny (Chaenopsis alepidota)
Yellowface pikeblenny (Chaenopsis limbaughi)
Bluethroat pikeblenny (Chaenopsis ocellata)
Resh pikeblenny (Chaenopsis resh)
Freckled pikeblenny (Chaenopsis roseola)
Plume blenny (Cirriemblemaria lucasana)
Angel blenny (Coralliozetus angelicus)
Barcheek blenny (Coralliozetus boehlkei)
Twinhorn blenny (Coralliozetus cardonae)
Scarletfin blenny (Coralliozetus micropes)
Spikefin blenny (Coralliozetus rosenblatti)
Springer's tube blenny (Coralliozetus springeri)
Reefsand blenny (Ekemblemaria myersi)
Moth blenny (Ekemblemaria nigra)
Banner blenny (Emblemaria atlantica)
Emblemaria australis
Twospot blenny (Emblemaria biocellata)
Caribbean blenny (Emblemaria caldwelli)
Colombian blenny (Emblemaria caycedoi)
Venezuelan blenny (Emblemaria diphyodontis)
Emblemaria hudsoni
Gulf signal blenny (Emblemaria hypacanthus)
Emblemaria pandionis
Sailfin signal blenny (Emblemaria piratica)
Pirate blenny (Emblemaria piratula)
Ribbon blenny (Emblemaria vitta)
Blackhead blenny (Emblemariopsis bahamensis)
Shorthead blenny (Emblemariopsis bottomei)
Caribbean flagfin blenny (Emblemariopsis carib)
Glass blenny (Emblemariopsis diaphana)
Fine-cirrus blenny (Emblemariopsis leptocirris)
Emblemariopsis occidentalis
Red banner blenny (Emblemariopsis ramirezi)
Ruetzler's blenny (Emblemariopsis ruetzleri)
Emblemariopsis signifer
Tayrona blenny (Emblemariopsis tayrona)
Wrasse blenny (Hemiemblemaria simulus)
Arrow blenny (Lucayablennius zingaro)
Sarcastic fringehead (Neoclinus blanchardi)
Neoclinus bryope
Neoclinus chihiroe
Neoclinus lacunicola
Neoclinus nudus
Neoclinus okazakii
Yellowfin fringehead (Neoclinus stephensae)
Neoclinus toshimaensis
One-spot fringehead (Neoclinus uninotatus)
Protemblemaria bicirrus
Protemblemaria punctata
Panamanian worm blenny (Stathmonotus culebrai)
Naked blenny (Stathmonotus gymnodermis)
Blackbelly blenny (Stathmonotus hemphillii)
Mexican worm blenny (Stathmonotus lugubris)
California worm blenny (Stathmonotus sinuscalifornici)
Southern eelgrass blenny (Stathmonotus stahli)
Northern eelgrass blenny (Stathmonotus tekla)

Combtooth blennies 

Sphinx blenny (Aidablennius sphynx)
Alloblennius anuchalis
Jugular blenny (Alloblennius jugularis)
Dwarf blenny (Alloblennius parvus)
Alloblennius pictus
Alticus anjouanae
Pacific leaping blenny (Alticus arnoldorum)
Kirk's blenny (Alticus kirkii)
Alticus magnusi
Alticus monochrus
Alticus montanoi
Alticus orientalis
Alticus sertatus
Marquesan rockskipper (Alticus simplicirrus)
Andamia amphibius
Andamia pacifica
Aden blenny (Antennablennius adenensis)
Moustached rockskipper (Antennablennius australis)
Horned rockskipper (Antennablennius bifilum)
Antennablennius ceylonensis
Arabian blenny (Antennablennius hypenetes)
Simony's blenny (Antennablennius simonyi)
Orangedotted blenny (Antennablennius variopunctatus)
Dussumier's blenny (Aspidontus dussumieri)
False cleanerfish (Aspidontus taeniatus)
Aspidontus tractus
Atrosalarias fuscus
Atrosalarias holomelas
Atrosalarias hosokawai
Lined rockskipper (Blenniella bilitonensis)
Pacific blue-spotted blenny (Blenniella caudolineata)
Blenniella chrysospilos
Striped rockskipper (Blenniella cyanostigma)
Picture rockskipper (Blenniella gibbifrons)
Dashed-line blenny (Blenniella interrupta)
Blenniella leopardus
Blenniella paula
Eyespot blenny (Blenniella periophthalmus)
Blennius normani
Butterfly blenny (Blennius ocellaris)
Looseskin blenny (Chalaroderma capito)
Two-eyed blenny (Chalaroderma ocellata)
Striped blenny (Chasmodes bosquianus)
Stretchjaw blenny (Chasmodes longimaxilla)
Florida blenny (Chasmodes saburrae)
Cirripectes alboapicalis
Kimberley blenny (Cirripectes alleni)
Blackflap blenny (Cirripectes auritus)
Chestnut blenny (Cirripectes castaneus)
Lady Musgrave blenny (Cirripectes chelomatus)
Filamentous blenny (Cirripectes filamentosus)
Dusky spotted blenny (Cirripectes fuscoguttatus)
Cirripectes gilberti
Cirripectes heemstraorum
Cirripectes hutchinsi
Cirripectes imitator
Cirripectes jenningsi
Cirripectes kuwamurai
Gargantuan blenny (Cirripectes obscurus)
Flaming blenny (Cirripectes perustus)
Cirripectes polyzona
Squiggly blenny (Cirripectes quagga)
Cirripectes randalli
Spotted eye-lash blenny (Cirripectes springeri)
Red-streaked blenny (Cirripectes stigmaticus)
Red-head blenny (Cirripectes vanderbilti)
Banded fringe blenny (Cirripectes variolosus)
Cirripectes viriosus
Cirrisalarias bunares
Montagu's blenny (Coryphoblennius galerita)
Triplespot blenny (Crossosalarias macrospilus)
Dodekablennos fraseri
Fourline blenny (Ecsenius aequalis)
Ecsenius alleni
Aron's blenny (Ecsenius aroni)
Australian blenny (Ecsenius australianus)
Axelrod's combtooth-blenny (Ecsenius axelrodi)
Banda clown blenny (Ecsenius bandanus)
Bath's comb-tooth (Ecsenius bathi)
Bicolor blenny (Ecsenius bicolor)
Twin-spot combtooth-blenny (Ecsenius bimaculatus)
Bluebelly blenny (Ecsenius caeruliventris)
Collete's blenny (Ecsenius collettei)
Ecsenius dentex
Ecsenius dilemma
Ecsenius fijiensis
Ecsenius fourmanoiri
Smooth-fin blenny (Ecsenius frontalis)
Red sea mimic blenny (Ecsenius gravieri)
Ecsenius isos
Lined combtooth-blenny (Ecsenius lineatus)
Blue-head combtooth-blenny (Ecsenius lividanalis)
Lubbock's combtooth-blenny (Ecsenius lubbocki)
Queensland blenny (Ecsenius mandibularis)
Java combtooth-blenny (Ecsenius melarchus)
Midas blenny (Ecsenius midas)
Ecsenius minutus
Ecsenius monoculus
Nalolo (Ecsenius nalolo)
Black combtooth-blenny (Ecsenius namiyei)
Ecsenius niue
Ecsenius oculatus
Ocular blenny (Ecsenius oculus)
Yellow-eye combtooth-blenny (Ecsenius ops)
Comical blenny (Ecsenius opsifrontalis)
Ecsenius pardus
Ecsenius paroculus
Pictus blenny (Ecsenius pictus)
Andaman combtooth-blenny (Ecsenius polystictus)
Ecsenius portenoyi
Ecsenius prooculis
Gulf blenny (Ecsenius pulcher)
Schroeder's combtooth-blenny (Ecsenius schroederi)
Saddle blenny (Ecsenius sellifer)
Ecsenius shirleyae
Great barrier reef blenny (Ecsenius stictus)
Tail-spot combtooth-blenny (Ecsenius stigmatura)
Ecsenius taeniatus
Ecsenius tessera
Three-lined blenny (Ecsenius trilineatus)
Pale-spotted combtooth-blenny (Ecsenius yaeyamaensis)
Enchelyurus ater
Enchelyurus brunneolus
Enchelyurus flavipes
Krauss' blenny (Enchelyurus kraussii)
Enchelyurus petersi
West African rockhopper (Entomacrodus cadenati)
Bartail blenny (Entomacrodus caudofasciatus)
Notchfin blenny (Entomacrodus chiostictus)
Entomacrodus corneliae
Pacific rockskipper (Entomacrodus cymatobiotus)
Wavyline rockskipper (Entomacrodus decussatus)
Fringelip rockskipper (Entomacrodus epalzeocheilos)
Entomacrodus lemuria
Entomacrodus lighti
Entomacrodus longicirrus
Entomacrodus macrospilus
Entomacrodus marmoratus
Pearl blenny (Entomacrodus nigricans)
Tattoo-chin rockskipper (Entomacrodus niuafoouensis)
Entomacrodus randalli
Entomacrodus rofeni
Seale's blenny (Entomacrodus sealei)
Stellar rockskipper (Entomacrodus stellifer)
Entomacrodus strasburgi
Blackspotted rockskipper (Entomacrodus striatus)
Textile blenny (Entomacrodus textilis)
Reef margin blenny (Entomacrodus thalassinus)
Vermiculated blenny (Entomacrodus vermiculatus)
Entomacrodus vomerinus
Entomacrodus williamsi
Leopard blenny (Exallias brevis)
Delicate blenny (Glyptoparus delicatulus)
Highbrow rockskipper (Hirculops cornifer)
West African speckled blenny (Hypleurochilus aequipinnis)
Hypleurochilus bananensis
Hypleurochilus bermudensis
Zebratail blenny (Hypleurochilus caudovittatus)
Hypleurochilus fissicornis
Hypleurochilus geminatus
Hypleurochilus langi
Featherduster blenny (Hypleurochilus multifilis)
Hypleurochilus pseudoaequipinnis
Hypleurochilus springeri
Hypsoblennius brevipinnis
Longhorn blenny (Hypsoblennius exstochilus)
Bay blenny (Hypsoblennius gentilis)
Notchbrow blenny (Hypsoblennius gilberti)
Feather blenny (Hypsoblennius hentz)
Tessellated blenny (Hypsoblennius invemar)
Freckled blenny (Hypsoblennius ionthas)
Mussel blenny (Hypsoblennius jenkinsi)
Peruvian blenny (Hypsoblennius paytensis)
Hypsoblennius robustus
Hypsoblennius sordidus
Imspringer (Istiblennius bellus)
Istiblennius colei
Dussumier's rockskipper (Istiblennius dussumieri)
Smoothlipped blenny (Istiblennius edentulus)
Istiblennius flaviumbrinus
Black-lined blenny (Istiblennius lineatus)
Peacock rockskipper (Istiblennius meleagris)
Istiblennius muelleri
Scarface rockskipper (Istiblennius pox)
Istiblennius rivulatus
Spotted rockskipper (Istiblennius spilotus)
Istiblennius steindachneri
Pallid rockskipper (Istiblennius unicolor)
Istiblennius zebra
Laiphognathus longispinis
Spotty blenny (Laiphognathus multimaculatus)
Shanny (Lipophrys pholis)
Lipophrys trigloides
Fowler's rockskipper (Litobranchus fowleri)
Lupinoblennius nicholsi
Upside-down harptail blenny (Meiacanthus abditus)
Eye-lash harptail-blenny (Meiacanthus atrodorsalis)
Bundoon blenny (Meiacanthus bundoon)
Meiacanthus crinitus
Meiacanthus cyanopterus
One-striped poison-fang blenny (Meiacanthus ditrema)
Meiacanthus fraseri
Meiacanthus geminatus
Striped poison-fang blenny (Meiacanthus grammistes)
Meiacanthus kamoharai
Lined fangblenny (Meiacanthus lineatus)
Yellow fangblenny (Meiacanthus luteus)
Mozambique fangblenny (Meiacanthus mossambicus)
Blackline fangblenny (Meiacanthus nigrolineatus)
Meiacanthus oualanensis
Meiacanthus procne
Disco blenny (Meiacanthus smithi)
Meiacanthus tongaensis
Meiacanthus urostigma
Meiacanthus vicinus
One-striped fangblenny (Meiacanthus vittatus)
Adriatic blenny (Microlipophrys adriaticus)
Microlipophrys caboverdensis
Microlipophrys canevae
Microlipophrys dalmatinus
Black-headed blenny (Microlipophrys nigriceps)
Microlipophrys velifer
Mimoblennius atrocinctus
Mimoblennius cas
Fringed blenny (Mimoblennius cirrosus)
Rusi blenny (Mimoblennius rusi)
Christmas blenny (Nannosalarias nativitatis)
Omobranchus anolius
Bandit blenny (Omobranchus banditus)
Omobranchus elegans
Chevroned blenny (Omobranchus elongatus)
Omobranchus fasciolatoceps
Omobranchus fasciolatus
Gossamer blenny (Omobranchus ferox)
Germain's blenny (Omobranchus germaini)
Omobranchus lineolatus
Omobranchus loxozonus
Omobranchus obliquus
Japanese blenny (Omobranchus punctatus)
Omobranchus rotundiceps
Omobranchus verticalis
Kappie blenny (Omobranchus woodi)
Omobranchus zebra
Omox lupus
Ophioblennius atlanticus
Ophioblennius macclurei
Large-banded blenny (Ophioblennius steindachneri)
Ophioblennius trinitatis
Parablennius cornutus
Parablennius cyclops
Parablennius dialloi
Tompot blenny (Parablennius gattorugine)
Parablennius goreensis
Mystery blenny (Parablennius incognitus)
Parablennius intermedius
Crested blenny (Parablennius laticlavius)
Seaweed blenny (Parablennius marmoreus)
Cheekspot blenny (Parablennius opercularis)
Rock-pool blenny (Parablennius parvicornis)
Ringneck blenny (Parablennius pilicornis)
Parablennius postoculomaculatus
Longstriped blenny (Parablennius rouxi)
Portuguese blenny (Parablennius ruber)
Parablennius salensis
Rusty blenny (Parablennius sanguinolentus)
Parablennius sierraensis
Tasmanian blenny (Parablennius tasmanianus)
Tentacled blenny (Parablennius tentacularis)
Tasseled blenny (Parablennius thysanius)
Yatabe blenny (Parablennius yatabei)
Zvonimir's blenny (Parablennius zvonimiri)
Parahypsos piersoni
Big-nose blenny (Paralticus amboinensis)
Hepburn's blenny (Parenchelyurus hepburni)
Parenchelyurus hyena
Kosi rockskipper (Pereulixia kosiensis)
Arabian fangblenny (Petroscirtes ancylodon)
Short-head sabretooth blenny (Petroscirtes breviceps)
Deceiver fangblenny (Petroscirtes fallax)
Wolf fangblenny (Petroscirtes lupus)
Petroscirtes marginatus
Highfinned blenny (Petroscirtes mitratus)
Petroscirtes pylei
Petroscirtes springeri
Thepas' sabretooth blenny (Petroscirtes thepassii)
Variable sabretooth blenny (Petroscirtes variabilis)
Bearded sabretooth blenny (Petroscirtes xestus)
Sabertooth blenny (Plagiotremus azaleus)
Blue-stripe blenny (Plagiotremus ewaensis)
Plagiotremus flavus
Biting blenny (Plagiotremus goslinei)
Bicolour fangblenny (Plagiotremus laudandus)
Imposter fangblenny (Plagiotremus phenax)
Bluestriped fangblenny (Plagiotremus rhinorhynchos)
Plagiotremus spilistius
Mimic blenny (Plagiotremus tapeinosoma)
Townsend's fangblenny (Plagiotremus townsendi)
Praealticus bilineatus
Praealticus caesius
Praealticus dayi
Crenulate-lipped rockskipper (Praealticus labrovittatus)
Praealticus margaritatus
Praealticus multistriatus
Praealticus oortii
Marianas rockskipper (Praealticus poptae)
Praealticus semicrenatus
Praealticus striatus
Praealticus tanegasimae
Praealticus triangulus
Rhabdoblennius nigropunctatus
Rhabdoblennius nitidus
Barchin blenny (Rhabdoblennius rhabdotrachelus)
Snow blenny (Rhabdoblennius snowi)
Salaria basilisca
Freshwater blenny (Salaria fluviatilis)
Peacock blenny (Salaria pavo)
White-spotted blenny (Salarias alboguttatus)
Seram blenny (Salarias ceramensis)
Banded jewelled-blenny (Salarias fasciatus)
Blue-spot blenny (Salarias guttatus)
Salarias luctuosus
Salarias nigrocinctus
Salarias obscurus
Patzner's blenny (Salarias patzneri)
Snowflake blenny (Salarias ramosus)
Segmented blenny (Salarias segmentatus)
Salarias sexfilum
Salarias sibogai
Fringelip blenny (Salarias sinuosus)
Scartella caboverdiana
Molly Miller (Scartella cristata)
Maned blenny (Scartella emarginata)
Scartella itajobi
Scartichthys crapulatus
Giant blenny (Scartichthys gigas)
Scartichthys variolatus
Scartichthys viridis
Seychelles blenny (Stanulus seychellensis)
Talbot's blenny (Stanulus talboti)
Japanese snake blenny (Xiphasia matsubarai)
Hairtail blenny (Xiphasia setifer)

Sea chubs 

Girella freminvillei
Opaleye (Girella nigricans)
Gulf opal eye (Girella simplicidens)
Zebra perch (Hermosilla azurea)
Kyphosus analogus
Brown chub (Kyphosus bigibbus)
Blue sea chub (Kyphosus cinerascens)
Cortez chub (Kyphosus elegans)
Revillagigedo sea chub (Kyphosus lutescens)
Bermuda sea chub (Kyphosus sectatrix)
Brassy chub (Kyphosus vaigiensis)
Halfmoon (Medialuna californiensis)

Goatfishes 

Mexican goatfish (Mulloidichthys dentatus)
Yellow goatfish (Mulloidichthys martinicus)
Mullus auratus
Striped goatfish (Mullus barbatus)
Striped red mullet (Mullus surmuletus)
Thicklipped goatfish (Parupeneus crassilabris)
Manybar goatfish (Parupeneus multifasciatus)
Parupeneus posteli
Bigscale goatfish (Pseudupeneus grandisquamis)
Spotted goatfish (Pseudupeneus maculatus)
Short-fin goatfish (Upeneus oligospilus)
Dwarf goatfish (Upeneus parvus)

Hawkfishes 

Twospot hawkfish (Amblycirrhitus bimacula)
Redspotted hawkfish (Amblycirrhitus pinos)
Amblycirrhitus unimacula
Spotted hawkfish (Cirrhitichthys aprinus)
Dwarf hawkfish (Cirrhitichthys falco)
Coral hawkfish (Cirrhitichthys oxycephalus)
Redbanded hawkfish (Cirrhitops fasciatus)
Cirrhitops hubbardi
West African hawkfish (Cirrhitus atlanticus)
Stocky hawkfish (Cirrhitus pinnulatus)
Giant hawkfish (Cirrhitus rivulatus)
Swallowtail hawkfish (Cyprinocirrhites polyactis)
Wilhelm's hawkfish (Itycirrhitus wilhelmi)
Flame hawkfish (Neocirrhites armatus)
Splendid hawkfish (Notocirrhitus splendens)
Longnose hawkfish (Oxycirrhites typus)
Arc-eye hawkfish (Paracirrhites arcatus)
Black-sided hawkfish (Paracirrhites forsteri)
Whitespot hawkfish (Paracirrhites hemistictus)
Paracirrhites nisus
Paracirrhites xanthus

Microdesmids 

Pugjaw wormfish (Cerdale floridana)
Microdesmus aethiopicus
Reef wormfish (Microdesmus bahianus)
Stippled wormfish (Microdesmus carri)
Lancetail wormfish (Microdesmus lanceolatus)
Pink wormfish (Microdesmus longipinnis)
Fire dartfish (Nemateleotris magnifica)
Parioglossus formosus
Parioglossus palustris
Parioglossus rainfordi
Yellow dartfish (Parioglossus raoi)
Striped dartfish (Parioglossus taeniatus)
Blue dartfish (Ptereleotris calliura)
Panamic dartfish (Ptereleotris carinata)
Helen's dartfish (Ptereleotris helenae)
Brazilian dartfish (Ptereleotris randalli)

Clinids 

Lace klipfish (Blennioclinus brachycephalus)
Silverbubble klipfish (Blennioclinus stella)
Snaky klipfish (Blennophis anguillaris)
Striped klipfish (Blennophis striatus)
Slender platanna-klipfish (Cancelloxus burrelli)
Whiteblotched klipfish (Cancelloxus elongatus)
Cancelloxus longior
Barbelled klipfish (Cirrhibarbis capensis)
Fleet klipfish (Climacoporus navalis)
Cline (Clinitrachus argentatus)
Ladder klipfish (Clinoporus biporosus)
Sad klipfish (Clinus acuminatus)
Agile klipfish (Clinus agilis)
Clinus arborescens
Onrust klipfish (Clinus berrisfordi)
Cape klipfish (Clinus brevicristatus)
Bluntnose klipfish (Clinus cottoides)
Helen's klipfish (Clinus helenae)
Westcoast klipfish (Clinus heterodon)
Chinese klipfish (Clinus nematopterus)
Robust klipfish (Clinus robustus)
Kelp klipfish (Clinus rotundifrons)
Super klipfish (Clinus superciliosus)
Bull klipfish (Clinus taurus)
Speckled klipfish (Clinus venustris)
Oldman klipfish (Clinus woodi)
Short-tassel weedfish (Cologrammus flavescens)
Silver-sided weedfish (Cristiceps argyropleura)
Golden weedfish (Cristiceps aurantiacus)
Crested weedfish (Cristiceps australis)
Orange clinid (Ericentrus rubrus)
Mousey klipfish (Fucomimus mus)
Gibbonsia elegans
Striped kelpfish (Gibbonsia metzi)
Crevice kelpfish (Gibbonsia montereyensis)
Adelaide's weedfish (Heteroclinus adelaidae)
Heteroclinus antinectes
Kelp weedfish (Heteroclinus eckloniae)
Heteroclinus equiradiatus
Seven-bar weedfish (Heteroclinus heptaeolus)
Johnston's weedfish (Heteroclinus johnstoni)
Heteroclinus kuiteri
Tasselled weedfish (Heteroclinus macrophthalmus)
Large-nose weedfish (Heteroclinus nasutus)
Common weedfish (Heteroclinus perspicillatus)
Little weedfish (Heteroclinus puellarum)
Rosy weedfish (Heteroclinus roseus)
Sharp-nose weedfish (Heteroclinus tristis)
Whitelegg's weedfish (Heteroclinus whiteleggii)
Wilson's weedfish (Heteroclinus wilsoni)
Giant kelpfish (Heterostichus rostratus)
Nosestripe klipfish (Muraenoclinus dorsalis)
Sailfin clinid (Myxodes cristatus)
Myxodes viridis
Earspot snakeblenny (Ophiclinops hutchinsi)
Variegated snake-blenny (Ophiclinops varius)
Dusky snakeblenny (Ophiclinus antarcticus)
Shortfin snakeblenny (Ophiclinus brevipinnis)
Frosted snake-blenny (Ophiclinus gabrieli)
Black-back snake-blenny (Ophiclinus gracilis)
Variable snake-blenny (Ophiclinus ningulus)
Whiteblotch snakeblenny (Ophiclinus pectoralis)
Pavoclinus caeruleopunctatus
Grass klipfish (Pavoclinus graminis)
Rippled klipfish (Pavoclinus laurentii)
Slinky klipfish (Pavoclinus litorafontis)
Bearded klipfish (Pavoclinus mentalis)
Mya's klipfish (Pavoclinus myae)
Peacock klipfish (Pavoclinus pavo)
Deepwater klipfish (Pavoclinus profundus)
Deep-reef klipfish (Pavoclinus smalei)
Ribeiroclinus eigenmanni
Leafy klipfish (Smithichthys fucorum)
Springeratus xanthosoma
Dusky crawler (Sticharium clarkae)
Sand crawler (Sticharium dorsale)
Platanna klipfish (Xenopoclinus kochi)
Leprous platanna-klipfish (Xenopoclinus leprosus)

Wrasses 

Scale-rayed wrasse (Acantholabrus palloni)
Sand wrasse (Ammolabrus dicrus)
Blue-spotted wrasse (Anampses caeruleopunctatus)
Psychedelic wrasse (Anampses chrysocephalus)
Pearl wrasse (Anampses cuvier)
Elegant wrasse (Anampses elegans)
Blue-striped orange tamarin (Anampses femininus)
Geographic wrasse (Anampses geographicus)
Blue and yellow wrasse (Anampses lennardi)
White-spotted wrasse (Anampses melanurus)
Spotted wrasse (Anampses meleagrides)
Black-banded wrasse (Anampses neoguinaicus)
Yellow-breasted wrasse (Anampses twistii)
Natal wrasse (Anchichoerops natalensis)
Black-spotted parrotfish (Austrolabrus maculatus)
Bodianus albotaeniatus
Lyre-tail hogfish (Bodianus anthioides)
Axilspot hogfish (Bodianus axillaris)
Hawaiian pigfish (Bodianus bathycapros)
Crescent banded hogfish (Bodianus bilunulatus)
Twospot hogfish (Bodianus bimaculatus)
Bodianus busellatus
Cylindrical hogfish (Bodianus cylindriatus)
Diana's hogfish (Bodianus diana)
Bodianus dictynna
Mexican hogfish (Bodianus diplotaenia)
Brown hogfish (Bodianus eclancheri)
Bodianus flavifrons
Island hogfish (Bodianus insularis)
Lined hogfish (Bodianus leucosticticus)
Blackfin hogfish (Bodianus loxozonus)
Giant hogfish (Bodianus macrognathos)
Black-banded hogfish (Bodianus macrourus)
Bodianus masudai
Split-level hogfish (Bodianus mesothorax)
Bay of Bengal hogfish (Bodianus neilli)
Blackspot hogfish (Bodianus opercularis)
Golden-spot hogfish (Bodianus perditio)
Bodianus prognathus
Spotfin hogfish (Bodianus pulchellus)
Spanish hogfish (Bodianus rufus)
Sunrise wrasse (Bodianus sanguineus)
Fourline hogfish (Bodianus trilineatus)
Red pigfish (Bodianus unimaculatus)
Bodianus vulpinus
Carolines parrotfish (Calotomus carolinus)
Calotomus japonicus
Spinytooth parrotfish (Calotomus spinidens)
Viridescent parrotfish (Calotomus viridescens)
Yellowbar parrotfish (Calotomus zonarchus)
Small-mouthed wrasse (Centrolabrus exoletus)
Red-speckled parrotfish (Cetoscarus bicolor)
Cetoscarus ocellatus
Abudjubbe's splendor wrasse (Cheilinus abudjubbe)
Floral wrasse (Cheilinus chlorourus)
Red-breasted wrasse (Cheilinus fasciatus)
Broomtail wrasse (Cheilinus lunulatus)
Pointed-head wrasse (Cheilinus oxycephalus)
Cheilinus quinquecinctus
Tripletail wrasse (Cheilinus trilobatus)
Cigar wrasse (Cheilio inermis)
Bluemoon parrotfish (Chlorurus atrilunula)
Bleeker's parrotfish (Chlorurus bleekeri)
Pink-margined parrotfish (Chlorurus capistratoides)
Blue humphead parrotfish (Chlorurus cyanescens)
Captain parrotfish (Chlorurus enneacanthus)
Tan-faced parrotfish (Chlorurus frontalis)
Sinai parrotfish (Chlorurus genazonatus)
Chlorurus gibbus
Palecheek parrotfish (Chlorurus japanensis)
Pacific steephead parrotfish (Chlorurus microrhinos)
Knothead parrotfish (Chlorurus oedema)
Spectacled parrotfish (Chlorurus perspicillatus)
Chlorurus rhakoura
Daisy parrotfish (Chlorurus sordidus)
Chlorurus spilurus
Indian Ocean steephead parrotfish (Chlorurus strongylocephalus)
Troschel's parrotfish (Chlorurus troschelii)
Orange-dotted tuskfish (Choerodon anchorago)
Bluespotted tuskfish (Choerodon cauteroma)
Grass tuskfish (Choerodon cephalotes)
Blue tuskfish (Choerodon cyanodus)
Harlequin tuskfish (Choerodon fasciatus)
Bridled tuskfish (Choerodon frenatus)
Choerodon gomoni
Graphic tuskfish (Choerodon graphicus)
Jordan's tuskfish (Choerodon jordani)
Choerodon margaritiferus
Choerodon melanostigma
Dark-spot tuskfish (Choerodon monostigma)
White-patch tuskfish (Choerodon oligacanthus)
Robust tuskfish (Choerodon robustus)
Baldchin groper (Choerodon rubescens)
Wedge-tailed tuskfish (Choerodon sugillatum)
Venus tuskfish (Choerodon venustus)
Redstripe tuskfish (Choerodon vitta)
Purple eyebrowed tuskfish (Choerodon zamboangae)
Black-blotch tuskfish (Choerodon zosterophorus)
Red-fin fairy wrasse (Cirrhilabrus adornatus)
Orangeback fairy-wrasse (Cirrhilabrus aurantidorsalis)
Deepwater wrasse (Cirrhilabrus bathyphilus)
Beau's wrasse (Cirrhilabrus beauperryi)
Purple-boned wrasse (Cirrhilabrus blatteus)
Cenderawasih wrasse (Cirrhilabrus cenderawasih)
Cirrhilabrus claire
Conde's fairy wrasse (Cirrhilabrus condei)
Orange-striped fairy wrasse (Cirrhilabrus earlei)
Yellowfin fairy-wrasse (Cirrhilabrus flavidorsalis)
Johnson's wrasse (Cirrhilabrus johnsoni)
Flame wrasse (Cirrhilabrus jordani)
Katherine's wrasse (Cirrhilabrus katherinae)
Cirrhilabrus katoi
Laboute's wrasse (Cirrhilabrus laboutei)
Long-tailed wrasse (Cirrhilabrus lanceolatus)
Purple-lined wrasse (Cirrhilabrus lineatus)
Lubbock's wrasse (Cirrhilabrus lubbocki)
Cirrhilabrus lunatus
Yellowband wrasse (Cirrhilabrus luteovittatus)
Marjorie's wrasse (Cirrhilabrus marjorie)
Cirrhilabrus melanomarginatus
Cirrhilabrus morrisoni
Cirrhilabrus punctatus
Blue-margin fairy-wrasse (Cirrhilabrus pylei)
Cirrhilabrus randalli
Rose-band fairy wrasse (Cirrhilabrus roseafascia)
Pink-margin wrasse (Cirrhilabrus rubrimarginatus)
Redfin wrasse (Cirrhilabrus rubripinnis)
Social wrasse (Cirrhilabrus rubriventralis)
Cirrhilabrus sanguineus
Scotts' wrasse (Cirrhilabrus scottorum)
Walindi fairy-wrasse (Cirrhilabrus walindi)
Cirrhilabrus walshi
Clepticus brasiliensis
Creole wrasse (Clepticus parrae)
Coris atlantica
Blushing wrasse (Coris auricularis)
Goldlined coris (Coris aurilineata)
Clown coris (Coris aygula)
Light colored wrasse fish (Coris ballieui)
Batu coris (Coris batuensis)
Spottail coris (Coris caudimacula)
Coris centralis
African wrasse (Coris cuvieri)
Debuen's coris (Coris debueni)
Pale-barred coris (Coris dorsomacula)
Yellowstripe coris (Coris flavovittata)
Queen coris (Coris formosa)
African clown wrasse (Coris gaimard)
Hewett's coris (Coris hewetti)
Mediterranean rainbow wrasse (Coris julis)
Marquesan coris (Coris marquesensis)
Coris musume
Combfish (Coris picta)
Blackstripe coris (Coris pictoides)
Red and green coris (Coris roseoviridis)
Sandager's wrasse (Coris sandeyeri)
Coris variegata
Elegant coris (Coris venusta)
Bluelip parrotfish (Cryptotomus roseus)
Goldsinny wrasse (Ctenolabrus rupestris)
Brown-lined wrasse (Cymolutes lecluse)
Knife razorfish (Cymolutes praetextatus)
Collared knifefish (Cymolutes torquatus)
Decodon melasma
Decodon puellaris
Yellowtail tubelip (Diproctacanthus xanthurus)
Dwarf wrasse (Doratonotus megalepis)
Allen's polly (Dotalabrus alleni)
Pretty polly (Dotalabrus aurantiacus)
Dwarf slingjaw wrasse (Epibulus brevis)
Sling-jaw wrasse (Epibulus insidiator)
Snakeskin wrasse (Eupetrichthys angustipes)
Birdfish (Gomphosus caeruleus)
Bird-nose wrasse (Gomphosus varius)
Blue weed whiting (Haletta semifasciata)
Argus wrasse (Halichoeres argus)
Greenband wrasse (Halichoeres bathyphilus)
Pearly-spotted wrasse (Halichoeres bicolor)
Banded rainbow fish (Halichoeres binotopsis)
Red-lined wrasse (Halichoeres biocellatus)
Slippery dick (Halichoeres bivittatus)
Brownfields wrasse (Halichoeres brownfieldi)
Halichoeres caudalis
Wounded wrasse (Halichoeres chierchiae)
Halichoeres chlorocephalus
Pastel-green wrasse (Halichoeres chloropterus)
Canary wrasse (Halichoeres chrysus)
Halichoeres claudia
Adorned wrasse (Halichoeres cosmetus)
Yellowcheek wrasse (Halichoeres cyanocephalus)
Halichoeres dimidiatus
Chameleon wrasse (Halichoeres dispilus)
Yellowhead wrasse (Halichoeres garnoti)
Hartzfeld's wrasse (Halichoeres hartzfeldii)
Checkerboard wrasse (Halichoeres hortulanus)
Halichoeres iridis
Pink-snouted wrasse (Halichoeres kallochroma)
Jewelled wrasse (Halichoeres lapillus)
Thinstripe wrasse (Halichoeres leptotaenia)
Canarytop wrasse (Halichoeres leucoxanthus)
Chain-line wrasse (Halichoeres leucurus)
Slippery okra (Halichoeres maculipinna)
Pearl-spotted wrasse (Halichoeres margaritaceus)
Dusky wrasse (Halichoeres marginatus)
Orange-fin wrasse (Halichoeres melanochir)
Halichoeres melanotis
Tail-spot wrasse (Halichoeres melanurus)
Cheekspot wrasse (Halichoeres melasmapomus)
Cheek-ring wrasse (Halichoeres miniatus)
Nebulous wrasse (Halichoeres nebulosus)
Spinster wrasse (Halichoeres nicholsi)
Bubblefin wrasse (Halichoeres nigrescens)
Halichoeres notospilus
Halichoeres orientalis
Ornamented wrasse (Halichoeres ornatissimus)
Babi wrasse (Halichoeres pallidus)
Weed wrasse (Halichoeres papilionaceus)
Halichoeres pardaleocephalus
Halichoeres penrosei
Halichoeres pictus
Axil spot wrasse (Halichoeres podostigma)
Halichoeres poeyi
Half-grey wrasse (Halichoeres prosopeion)
Puddingwife wrasse (Halichoeres radiatus)
Richmond's wrasse (Halichoeres richmondi)
Brownbanded wrasse (Halichoeres scapularis)
Rock wrasse (Halichoeres semicinctus)
Solor wrasse (Halichoeres solorensis)
U-spot wrasse (Halichoeres stigmaticus)
Chinese wrasse (Halichoeres tenuispinis)
Timor wrasse (Halichoeres timorensis)
Halichoeres trimaculatus
Triplespot wrasse (Halichoeres trispilus)
Indian Ocean pinstriped wrasse (Halichoeres vrolikii)
Ceylon wrasse (Halichoeres zeylonicus)
Barred thicklip (Hemigymnus fasciatus)
Blackedge thicklip wrasse (Hemigymnus melapterus)
Rainbow cale (Heteroscarus acroptilus)
Candelamoa parrotfish (Hipposcarus harid)
Pacific longnose parrotfish (Hipposcarus longiceps)
Narrow-banded rainbowfish (Hologymnosus annulatus)
Candy cane wrasse (Hologymnosus doliatus)
Pale slender wrasse (Hologymnosus longipes)
Redback longface wrasse (Hologymnosus rhodonotus)
Pale razorfish (Iniistius aneitensis)
Iniistius auropunctatus
Baldwin's razorfish (Iniistius baldwini)
Two-spot razorfish (Iniistius bimaculatus)
Bronzespot razorfish (Iniistius celebicus)
Blackspot razorfish (Iniistius dea)
Iniistius evides
Griffiths' razor fish (Iniistius griffithsi)
Keel-head (Iniistius jacksonensis)
Fin-spot razor wrasse (Iniistius melanopus)
Black-barred razorfish (Iniistius pavo)
Fivefinger razorfish (Iniistius pentadactylus)
Iniistius twistii
Blackside razorfish (Iniistius umbrilatus)
Iniistius verrens
Tubelip wrasse (Labrichthys unilineatus)
Bicolor cleanerfish (Labroides bicolor)
Bluestreak cleaner wrasse (Labroides dimidiatus)
Black-spot cleaner wrasse (Labroides pectoralis)
Hawaiian cleaner wrasse (Labroides phthirophagus)
Golden cleanerwrasse (Labroides rubrolabiatus)
Allen's tubelip (Labropsis alleni)
Southern tubelip (Labropsis australis)
Northern tubelip (Labropsis manabei)
Micronesian wrasse (Labropsis micronesica)
Labropsis polynesica
Blacklobe wrasse (Labropsis xanthonota)
Ballan wrasse (Labrus bergylta)
Brown wrasse (Labrus merula)
Cuckoo wrasse (Labrus mixtus)
Iris wrasse (Lappanella fasciata)
Ocre-band wrasse (Leptojulis chrysotaenia)
Blue-spot V-wrasse (Leptojulis cyanopleura)
Black-spot V-wrasse (Leptojulis polylepis)
Tail-spot V-wrasse (Leptojulis urostigma)
Marbled parrotfish (Leptoscarus vaigiensis)
Divided wrasse (Macropharyngodon bipartitus)
Choat's wrasse (Macropharyngodon choati)
Macropharyngodon cyanoguttatus
Geoffroy's wrasse (Macropharyngodon geoffroy)
Kuiter's wrasse (Macropharyngodon kuiteri)
Guinea fowl wrasse (Macropharyngodon meleagris)
Macropharyngodon moyeri
Negros wrasse (Macropharyngodon negrosensis)
False leopard (Macropharyngodon ornatus)
Madagascar wrasse (Macropharyngodon vivienae)
Minute wrasse (Minilabrus striatus)
Tristan rainbow wrasse (Nelabrichthys ornatus)
Little weed whiting (Neoodax balteatus)
Nicholsina collettei
Loosetooth parrotfish (Nicholsina denticulata)
Emerald parrotfish (Nicholsina usta)
Spotty (Notolabrus celidotus)
Girdled wrasse (Notolabrus cinctus)
Banded parrotfish (Notolabrus fucicola)
Crimson banded wrasse (Notolabrus gymnogenis)
Inscribed wrasse (Notolabrus inscriptus)
Brown spotted wrasse (Notolabrus parilus)
Blue-throated parrotfish (Notolabrus tetricus)
Green-banner wrasse (Novaculichthys macrolepidotus)
Dragon wrasse (Novaculichthys taeniourus)
Bluefinned butterfish (Odax cyanoallix)
Greenbone (Odax pullus)
Herring cale (Olisthops cyanomelas)
Butcher's prick (Ophthalmolepis lineolata)
Arenatus wrasse (Oxycheilinus arenatus)
Comettailed wrasse (Oxycheilinus bimaculatus)
Celebes Maori wrasse (Oxycheilinus celebicus)
Cheek-lined wrasse (Oxycheilinus digramma)
Oxycheilinus lineatus
Mental wrasse (Oxycheilinus mentalis)
Oriental Maori wrasse (Oxycheilinus orientalis)
Ringtail Maori wrasse (Oxycheilinus unifasciatus)
Oxyjulis californica
Angular flasher (Paracheilinus angulatus)
Paracheilinus attenuatus
Bell's flasher (Paracheilinus bellae)
Blue flasher-wrasse (Paracheilinus cyaneus)
Filamented flasher (Paracheilinus filamentosus)
Yellow-fin flasher-wrasse (Paracheilinus flavianalis)
Paracheilinus hemitaeniatus
Spot-lined flasher (Paracheilinus lineopunctatus)
McCosker's flasher wrasse (Paracheilinus mccoskeri)
Paracheilinus nursalim
Red sea eightline flasher (Paracheilinus octotaenia)
Paracheilinus piscilineatus
Paracheilinus rubricaudalis
Togean flasher wrasse (Paracheilinus togeanensis)
Paracheilinus walton
Multicolorfin rainbowfish (Parajulis poecilepterus)
Patrician wrasse (Pictilabrus laticlavius)
Green senator wrasse (Pictilabrus viridis)
Yellowstriped hogfish (Polylepion russelli)
Pelvic-spot wrasse (Pseudocheilinops ataenia)
Pseudocheilinus citrinus
Striated wrasse (Pseudocheilinus evanidus)
Six-line wrasse (Pseudocheilinus hexataenia)
White-barred wrasse (Pseudocheilinus ocellatus)
Eight-lined wrasse (Pseudocheilinus octotaenia)
Four-lined wrasse (Pseudocheilinus tetrataenia)
Rust-banded wrasse (Pseudocoris aurantiofasciata)
Philippine wrasse (Pseudocoris bleekeri)
Torpedo wrasse (Pseudocoris heteroptera)
Yamashiro's wrasse (Pseudocoris yamashiroi)
Chiseltooth wrasse (Pseudodax moluccanus)
Ring-cheek slender wrasse (Pseudojuloides argyreogaster)
Blue-head slender-wrasse (Pseudojuloides erythrops)
Blue-nose wrasse (Pseudojuloides kaleidos)
Black-patch wrasse (Pseudojuloides mesostigma)
Fiery slender wrasse (Pseudojuloides pyrius)
Black-hat slender wrasse (Pseudojuloides severnsi)
Redband wrasse (Pseudolabrus biserialis)
Red naped wrasse (Pseudolabrus eoethinus)
Pseudolabrus fuentesi
Pseudolabrus gayi
Günther's wrasse (Pseudolabrus guentheri)
Orange wrasse (Pseudolabrus luculentus)
Scarlet wrasse (Pseudolabrus miles)
Rosy parrotfish (Pseudolabrus mortonii)
Pseudolabrus semifasciatus
Pseudolabrus sieboldi
Pseudolabrus torotai
Cryptic wrasse (Pteragogus cryptus)
Cockerel wrasse (Pteragogus enneacanthus)
Cocktail fish (Pteragogus flagellifer)
White-barred sneaky-wrasse (Pteragogus guttatus)
Sideburn wrasse (Pteragogus pelycus)
Cheekbar wrasse (Pteragogus taeniops)
Filament-finned parrotfish (Scarus altipinnis)
Arabian parrotfish (Scarus arabicus)
Redbarred parrotfish (Scarus caudofasciatus)
Chameleon parrotfish (Scarus chameleon)
Blue parrotfish (Scarus coeruleus)
Red sea parrotfish (Scarus collana)
Azure parrotfish (Scarus compressus)
Turquoise-capped parrotfish (Scarus dimidiatus)
Regal parrotfish (Scarus dubius)
Sicklefin parrotfish (Scarus falcipinnis)
Rusty parrotfish (Scarus ferrugineus)
Festive parrotfish (Scarus festivus)
Yellowfin parrotfish (Scarus flavipectoralis)
Forsten's parrotfish (Scarus forsteni)
Bridled parrotfish (Scarus frenatus)
Darktail parrotfish (Scarus fuscocaudalis)
Purple-brown parrotfish (Scarus fuscopurpureus)
Blue-barred parrotfish (Scarus ghobban)
Globehead parrotfish (Scarus globiceps)
Guinean parrotfish (Scarus hoefleri)
Mottlefin parrotfish (Scarus iseri)
Marquesan parrotfish (Scarus koputea)
Highfin parrotfish (Scarus longipinnis)
Swarthy parrotfish (Scarus niger)
Dark-capped parrotfish (Scarus oviceps)
Scarus perrico
Gulf parrotfish (Scarus persicus)
Singapore parrotfish (Scarus prasiognathos)
Common parrotfish (Scarus psittacus)
Blue banded parrotfish (Scarus pyrrostethus)
Quoy's parrotfish (Scarus quoyi)
Rivulated parrotfish (Scarus rivulatus)
Ember parrotfish (Scarus rubroviolaceus)
Eclipse parrotfish (Scarus russelii)
Five-saddle parrotfish (Scarus scaber)
Yellowband parrotfish (Scarus schlegeli)
Spiny parrotfish (Scarus spinus)
Princess parrotfish (Scarus taeniopterus)
Tricolour parrotfish (Scarus tricolor)
Queen parrotfish (Scarus vetula)
Greenlip parrotfish (Scarus viridifucatus)
Red parrotfish (Scarus xanthopleura)
Tubemouth (Siphonognathus argyrophanes)
Slender weed whiting (Siphonognathus attenuatus)
Pencil weed whiting (Siphonognathus beddomei)
Sharpnose weed whiting (Siphonognathus caninis)
Long-rayed weed whiting (Siphonognathus radiatus)
Reef parrotfish (Sparisoma amplum)
Greenblotch parrotfish (Sparisoma atomarium)
Redband parrotfish (Sparisoma aurofrenatum)
Redtail parrotfish (Sparisoma chrysopterum)
Sparisoma cretense
Sparisoma radians
Redfin parrotfish (Sparisoma rubripinne)
Strigate parrotfish (Sparisoma strigatum)
Sparisoma tuiupiranga
Stoplight parrotfish (Sparisoma viride)
Stethojulis albovittata
Belted wrasse (Stethojulis balteata)
Orange-axil wrasse (Stethojulis bandanensis)
Cut-ribbon wrasse (Stethojulis interrupta)
Stethojulis maculata
Stethojulis marquesensis
Stethojulis notialis
Silver-streaked rainbowfish (Stethojulis strigiventer)
Stethojulis terina
Blue-ribbon wrasse (Stethojulis trilineata)
Rainbow slender wrasse (Suezichthys arquatus)
Crimson cleaner fish (Suezichthys aylingi)
Red sea slender wrasse (Suezichthys caudavittatus)
Blue-throated rainbow wrasse (Suezichthys cyanolaemus)
Australian slender wrasse (Suezichthys devisi)
Slender wrasse (Suezichthys gracilis)
Japanese rainbow wrasse (Suezichthys notatus)
Soela trawl wrasse (Suezichthys soelae)
Baillon's wrasse (Symphodus bailloni)
Symphodus caeruleus
Grey wrasse (Symphodus cinereus)
Symphodus doderleini
Axillary wrasse (Symphodus mediterraneus)
Blacktailed wrasse (Symphodus melanocercus)
Corkwing wrasse (Symphodus melops)
Ocellated wrasse (Symphodus ocellatus)
Five-spotted wrasse (Symphodus roissali)
Pointed-snout wrasse (Symphodus rostratus)
East Atlantic peacock wrasse (Symphodus tinca)
Symphodus trutta
Bergall (Tautogolabrus adspersus)
Yellow-stripe hogfish (Terelabrus rubrovittatus)
Bluntheaded wrasse (Thalassoma amblycephalum)
Blacktail wrasse (Thalassoma ballieui)
Bluehead wrasse (Thalassoma bifasciatum)
Cupid wrasse (Thalassoma cupido)
Saddle wrasse (Thalassoma duperrey)
Red-cheek wrasse (Thalassoma genivittatum)
Sunset wrasse (Thalassoma grammaticum)
Sixbar wrasse (Thalassoma hardwicke)
Goldbar wrasse (Thalassoma hebraicum)
Pitcairn rainbow wrasse (Thalassoma heiseri)
Jansen's wrasse (Thalassoma jansenii)
Cortez rainbow wrasse (Thalassoma lucasanum)
Moon wrasse (Thalassoma lunare)
Yellow-brown wrasse (Thalassoma lutescens)
Newton's wrasse (Thalassoma newtoni)
Black-barred wrasse (Thalassoma nigrofasciatum)
Noronha wrasse (Thalassoma noronhanum)
Ornate wrasse (Thalassoma pavo)
Surge wrasse (Thalassoma purpureum)
Fivestripe wrasse (Thalassoma quinquevittatum)
Klunzinger's wrasse (Thalassoma rueppellii)
Christmas wrasse (Thalassoma trilobatum)
Diagonal-lined wrasse (Wetmorella albofasciata)
Blackspot pigmy wrasse (Wetmorella nigropinnata)
Finspot wrasse (Xenojulis margaritaceus)
Blue-banded wrasse (Xiphocheilus typus)
Marmalade razorfish (Xyrichtys blanchardi)
Halstead's razorfish (Xyrichtys halsteadi)
Xyrichtys incandescens
Rosy razorfish (Xyrichtys martinicensis)
Cape razorfish (Xyrichtys mundiceps)
Pearly razorfish (Xyrichtys novacula)
Pastel razorfish (Xyrichtys pastellus)
Sand greenfish (Xyrichtys sanctaehelenae)
Green razorfish (Xyrichtys splendens)
Wood's razorfish (Xyrichtys woodi)

Threefin blennies 

Acanthanectes hystrix
Acanthanectes rufus
Tasseled triplefin (Apopterygion alta)
Ocellate triplefin (Apopterygion oculus)
Panama triplefin (Axoclinus lucillae)
Cortez triplefin (Axoclinus nigricaudus)
Carmine triplefin (Axoclinus storeyae)
Mottled twister (Bellapiscis lesleyae)
Twister (Bellapiscis medius)
Giant triplefin (Blennodon dorsale)
Southern barred triplefin (Brachynectes fasciatus)
Spotted spiny-eye triplefin (Ceratobregma acanthops)
Striped spiny-eye triplefin (Ceratobregma helenae)
Cape triplefin (Cremnochorites capensis)
Lizard triplefin (Crocodilichthys gracilis)
Cryptic triplefin (Cryptichthys jojettae)
Lofty triplefin (Enneanectes altivelis)
Blackedge triplefin (Enneanectes atrorus)
Enneanectes boehlkei
Delicate triplefin (Enneanectes carminalis)
Two-bar triplefin (Enneanectes deloachorum)
Mimic triplefin (Enneanectes jordani)
Matador triplefin (Enneanectes matador)
Redeye blenny (Enneanectes pectoralis)
Network triplefin (Enneanectes reticulatus)
Yellow triplefin (Enneapterygius abeli)
Highfin triplefin (Enneapterygius altipinnis)
Hawaiian blackhead triplefin (Enneapterygius atriceps)
Blackthroat triplefin (Enneapterygius atrogulare)
Enneapterygius bahasa
Enneapterygius cheni
Barred triplefin (Enneapterygius clarkae)
Clea's triplefin (Enneapterygius clea)
Enneapterygius destai 
Enneapterygius elaine
Hourglass triplefin (Enneapterygius elegans)
Enneapterygius etheostoma
Tiny threefin (Enneapterygius fasciatus)
Yellownape tripplefin (Enneapterygius flavoccipitis)
Blackbelly triplefin (Enneapterygius fuscoventer)
Enneapterygius genamaculatus
Northern yellow-black triplefin (Enneapterygius gracilis)
Enneapterygius gruschkai
Halfblack triplefin (Enneapterygius hemimelas)
Holleman's triplefin (Enneapterygius hollemani)
Lord Howe Island triplefin (Enneapterygius howensis)
Enneapterygius hsiojenae
Kermadec triplefin (Enneapterygius kermadecensis)
Enneapterygius kosiensis
Western Australian black-head triplefin (Enneapterygius larsonae)
Enneapterygius melanospilus
Minute triplefin (Enneapterygius minutus)
Miracle triplefin (Enneapterygius mirabilis)
Izu Islands triplefin (Enneapterygius miyakensis)
Pygmy triplefin (Enneapterygius nanus)
Black triplefin (Enneapterygius niger)
Pacific blacktail triplefin (Enneapterygius nigricauda)
Enneapterygius obscurus
Henderson triplefin (Enneapterygius ornatus)
Pale white-spotted triplefin (Enneapterygius pallidoserialis)
Enneapterygius pallidus
New Caledonian striped triplefin (Enneapterygius paucifasciatus)
Enneapterygius philippinus
Highcrest triplefin (Enneapterygius pusillus)
Pyramid triplefin (Enneapterygius pyramis)
Enneapterygius qirmiz
Rapa triplefin (Enneapterygius randalli)
Umpire triplefin (Enneapterygius rhabdotus)
Surf triplefin (Enneapterygius rhothion)
Redtail triplefin (Enneapterygius rubicauda)
Redcap triplefin (Enneapterygius rufopileus)
Enneapterygius senoui
Enneapterygius shaoi
Flagtail triplefin (Enneapterygius signicauda)
Black-and-red triplefin (Enneapterygius similis)
White-spotted triplefin (Enneapterygius triserialis)
Enneapterygius trisignatus
High-hat triplefin (Enneapterygius tutuilae)
Onespot triplefin (Enneapterygius unimaculatus)
Blotched triplefin (Enneapterygius ventermaculus)
Blacksaddle triplefin (Enneapterygius vexillarius)
William's triplefin (Enneapterygius williamsi)
Ziegler's triplefin (Enneapterygius ziegleri)
Spotted robust triplefin (Forsterygion capito)
Yellow-and-black triplefin (Forsterygion flavonigrum)
Tasmanian robust triplefin (Forsterygion gymnota)
Common triplefin (Forsterygion lapillum)
Mottled triplefin (Forsterygion malcolmi)
Oblique-swimming triplefin (Forsterygion maryannae)
Estuarine triplefin (Forsterygion nigripenne)
Variable triplefin (Forsterygion varium)
Obscure triplefin (Gilloblennius abditus)
Thripenny (Gilloblennius tripennis)
Helcogramma albimacula
Helcogramma alkamr
Helcogramma aquila
Helcogramma ascensionis
Helcogramma billi
Hooded triplefin (Helcogramma capidata)
Helcogramma cerasina
Little hooded triplefin (Helcogramma chica)
Black-throated triplefin (Helcogramma decurrens)
Helcogramma desa
Red-eye threefin (Helcogramma ellioti)
Helcogramma ememes
Fourspot triplefin (Helcogramma fuscipectoris)
Blackfin triplefin (Helcogramma fuscopinna)
Red-finned triplefin (Helcogramma gymnauchen)
Hudson's triplefin (Helcogramma hudsoni)
Triangle triplefin (Helcogramma inclinata)
Helmet triplefin (Helcogramma kranos)
Helcogramma lacuna
Helcogramma microstigma
Helcogramma nesion
Helcogramma nigra
New Caledonian triplefin (Helcogramma novaecaledoniae)
Shortsnout triplefin (Helcogramma obtusirostris)
Helcogramma randalli
Helcogramma rharhabe
Rhinocerus triplefin (Helcogramma rhinoceros)
Helcogramma rosea
Helcogramma serendip
Springer's triplefin (Helcogramma springeri)
Red triplefin (Helcogramma steinitzi)
Tropical striped triplefin (Helcogramma striata)
Helcogramma trigloides
Helcogramma vulcana
Helcogrammoides chilensis
Cunningham's triplefin (Helcogrammoides cunninghami)
Scaly-headed triplefin (Karalepis stewarti)
Eastern jumping blenny (Lepidoblennius haplodactylus)
Western jumping blenny (Lepidoblennius marmoratus)
Signal triplefin (Lepidonectes clarkhubbsi)
Chatham deep-water triplefin (Matanui bathytaton)
Deepwater triplefin (Matanui profundum)
Tropical scaly-headed triplefin (Norfolkia brachylepis)
Leeuwin triplefin (Norfolkia leeuwin)
Scalyhead triplefin (Norfolkia squamiceps)
Thomas' triplefin (Norfolkia thomasi)
Blue dot triplefin (Notoclinops caerulepunctus)
Blue-eyed triplefin (Notoclinops segmentatus)
Yaldwyn's triplefin (Notoclinops yaldwyni)
Brown topknot (Notoclinus compressus)
New Zealand topknot (Notoclinus fenestratus)
Longfinned triplefin (Ruanoho decemdigitatus) 
Spectacled triplefin (Ruanoho whero)
Japanese blacktail triplefin (Springerichthys bapturus)
Kulbicki's triplefin (Springerichthys kulbickii)
Bullhead triplefin (Trianectes bucephalus)
Clarke's triplefin (Trinorfolkia clarkei)
Crested triplefin (Trinorfolkia cristata)
Notched triplefin (Trinorfolkia incisa)
Black-faced blenny (Tripterygion delaisi)
Tripterygion melanurum
Tripterygion tartessicum
Red-black triplefin (Tripterygion tripteronotum)
Largemouth triplefin (Ucla xenogrammus)

Pomacanthids 

Banded angelfish (Apolemichthys arcuatus)
Griffis angelfish (Apolemichthys griffisi)
Tiger angelfish (Apolemichthys kingi)
Threespot angelfish (Apolemichthys trimaculatus)
Goldspotted angelfish (Apolemichthys xanthopunctatus)
Yellow-ear angelfish (Apolemichthys xanthotis)
Indian yellowtail angelfish (Apolemichthys xanthurus)
Centropyge abei
Orangeback angelfish (Centropyge acanthops)
Cherubfish (Centropyge argi)
Golden angelfish (Centropyge aurantia)
Flameback angelfish (Centropyge aurantonotus)
Bicolor angelfish (Centropyge bicolor)
Twospined angelfish (Centropyge bispinosa)
Peppermint angelfish (Centropyge boylei)
Cocos-Keeling angelfish (Centropyge colini)
Blue Mauritius angelfish (Centropyge debelius)
Blacktail angelfish (Centropyge eibli)
Rusty angelfish (Centropyge ferrugata)
Fisher's angelfish (Centropyge fisheri)
Yellowfin angelfish (Centropyge flavipectoralis)
Lemonpeel angelfish (Centropyge flavissima)
Herald's angelfish (Centropyge heraldi)
Blackear angelfish (Centropyge hotumatua)
Japanese angelfish (Centropyge interruptus)
Yellowhead angelfish (Centropyge joculator)
Flame angelfish (Centropyge loricula)
Multicolor angelfish (Centropyge multicolor)
Bluefin dwarf (Centropyge multispinis)
Narc angelfish (Centropyge narcosis)
Black-spot pygmy angelfish (Centropyge nigriocellus)
Midnight angelfish (Centropyge nox)
Russet angelfish (Centropyge potteri)
Resplendent pygmy angelfish (Centropyge resplendens)
Mango angelfish (Centropyge shepardi)
Black angelfish (Centropyge tibicen)
Purplemask angelfish (Centropyge venusta)
Pearlscale angelfish (Centropyge vrolikii)
Ballina angelfish (Chaetodontoplus ballinae)
Orangeface angelfish (Chaetodontoplus chrysocephalus)
Conspicuous angelfish (Chaetodontoplus conspicillatus)
Velvet angelfish (Chaetodontoplus dimidiatus)
Chaetodontoplus duboulayi
Black-velvet angelfish (Chaetodontoplus melanosoma)
Queensland yellowtail angelfish (Chaetodontoplus meredithi)
Vermiculate angelfish (Chaetodontoplus mesoleucus)
Chaetodontoplus niger
Spottedface angelfish (Chaetodontoplus personifer)
Chaetodontoplus poliourus
Bluestriped angelfish (Chaetodontoplus septentrionalis)
Ornate angelfish (Genicanthus bellus)
Zebra angelfish (Genicanthus caudovittatus)
Blackstriped angelfish (Genicanthus lamarck)
Spotbreast angelfish (Genicanthus melanospilos)
Masked angelfish (Genicanthus personatus)
Halfbanded angelfish (Genicanthus semicinctus)
Japanese swallow (Genicanthus semifasciatus)
Pitcairn angelfish (Genicanthus spinus)
Genicanthus takeuchii
Blackedged angelfish (Genicanthus watanabei)
Guinean angelfish (Holacanthus africanus)
Bermuda blue angelfish (Holacanthus bermudensis)
Queen angelfish (Holacanthus ciliaris)
King angelfish (Holacanthus passer)
Rock beauty (Holacanthus tricolor)
Barred angelfish (Paracentropyge multifasciata)
Blue ring angelfish (Pomacanthus annularis)
Gray angelfish (Pomacanthus arcuatus)
Arabian angelfish (Pomacanthus asfur)
Goldtail angelfish (Pomacanthus chrysurus)
Emperor angelfish (Pomacanthus imperator)
Yellowbar angelfish (Pomacanthus maculosus)
Bluegirdled angelfish (Pomacanthus navarchus)
French angelfish (Pomacanthus paru)
Old woman angelfish (Pomacanthus rhomboides)
Semicircle angelfish (Pomacanthus semicirculatus)
Sixbar angelfish (Pomacanthus sexstriatus)
Blue-faced angelfish (Pomacanthus xanthometopon)
Cortez angelfish (Pomacanthus zonipectus)
Royal angelfish (Pygoplites diacanthus)

Haemulids 

Silvergray grunt (Anisotremus caesius)
Xantic sargo (Anisotremus davidsonii)
Burito grunt (Anisotremus interruptus)
Brownstriped grunt (Anisotremus moricandi)
Anisotremus scapularis
Panama porkfish (Anisotremus taeniatus)
Porkfish (Anisotremus virginicus)
Lemoneye grunt (Conodon macrops)
Barred grunt (Conodon nobilis)
Armed grunt (Conodon serrifer)
Bonnetmouth (Emmelichthyops atlanticus)
Blackbarred grunt (Genyatremus dovii)
Carruco grunt (Genyatremus pacifici)
Tomtate (Haemulon aurolineatum)
Haemulon bonariense
Haemulon boschmae
Caesar grunt (Haemulon carbonarium)
Smallmouth grunt (Haemulon chrysargyreum)
Cortez grunt (Haemulon flaviguttatum)
Haemulon flavolineatum
Spanish grunt (Haemulon macrostomum)
Spottail grunt (Haemulon maculicauda)
Cottonwick (Haemulon melanurum)
Haemulon parra
Jolle cocoon (Haemulon plumierii)
Blue striped grunt (Haemulon sciurus)
Mojarra grunt (Haemulon scudderii)
Graybar grunt (Haemulon sexfasciatum)
Latin grunt (Haemulon steindachneri)
Striped grunt (Haemulon striatum)
Boga (Haemulon vittatum)
Axil grunt (Haemulopsis axillaris)
Roughneck grunt (Haemulopsis corvinaeformis)
Elongate grunt (Haemulopsis elongatus)
Raucous grunt (Haemulopsis leuciscus)
Shining grunt (Haemulopsis nitidus)
Cabinza grunt (Isacia conceptionis)
Shortfin grunt (Microlepidotus brevipinnis)
Wavyline grunt (Microlepidotus inornatus)
Orthopristis chalceus
Orthopristis chrysoptera
Orthopristis reddingi
Corocoro grunt (Orthopristis ruber)
Guinean grunt (Parapristipoma humile)
African striped grunt (Parapristipoma octolineatum)
Brown sweetlips (Plectorhinchus gibbosus)
Biglip grunt (Plectorhinchus macrolepis)
Pomadasys argenteus
Sand grunt (Pomadasys branickii)
Bastard grunt (Pomadasys incisus)
Sompat grunt (Pomadasys jubelini)
Longspine grunt (Pomadasys macracanthus)
Saddle grunt (Pomadasys maculatus)
Panama grunt (Pomadasys panamensis)
Pomadasys perotaei
Pigsnout grunt (Pomadasys rogerii)
Longfin salema (Xenichthys xanti)
Californian salema (Xenistius californiensis)

Apogonids 

Blacktip cardinalfish (Apogon atradorsatus)
Plain cardinalfish (Apogon atricaudus)
Bridle cardinalfish (Apogon aurolineatus)
Apogon axillaris
Barred cardinalfish (Apogon binotatus)
Ochre-striped cardinalfish (Apogon compressus)
Tailspot cardinalfish (Apogon dovii)
Flower cardinalfish (Apogon fleurieu)
Deepwater cardinalfish (Apogon gouldi)
Guadalupe cardinalfish (Apogon guadalupensis)
Mangrove cardinalfish (Apogon hyalosoma)
Mediterranean cardinalfish (Apogon imberbis)
Apogon indicus
Whitestar cardinalfish (Apogon lachneri)
Slendertail cardinalfish (Apogon leptocaulus)
Spotted cardinalfish (Apogon maculatus)
Red-striped cardinalfish (Apogon margaritophorus)
Dwarf cardinalfish (Apogon mosavi)
Mini cardinalfish (Apogon neotes)
Spotnape cardinalfish (Apogon notatus)
Pink cardinalfish (Apogon pacificus)
Mimic cardinalfish (Apogon phenax)
Broadsaddle cardinalfish (Apogon pillionatus)
Pale cardinalfish (Apogon planifrons)
Twospot cardinalfish (Apogon pseudomaculatus)
Apogon quadrisquamatus
Barspot cardinalfish (Apogon retrosella)
Striped cardinalfish (Apogon robbyi)
Roughlip cardinalfish (Apogon robinsi)
Orangespot cardinalfish (Apogon rubrimacula)
Cheekbar cardinalfish (Apogon sealei)
Belted cardinalfish (Apogon townsendi)
Kupang cardinalfish (Apogon wassinki)
Ocellated cardinalfish (Apogonichthys ocellatus)
Bronze cardinalfish (Astrapogon alutus)
Blackfin cardinalfish (Astrapogon puncticulatus)
Truncate cardinalfish (Cheilodipterus singapurensis)
Nectamia annularis
Ghost cardinalfish (Nectamia fusca)
Nectamia zebrinus
Humpback cardinal (Ostorhinchus lateralis)
Bigtooth cardinalfish (Paroncheilus affinis)
Freckled cardinalfish (Phaeoptyx conklini)
Dusky cardinalfish (Phaeoptyx pigmentaria)
Sponge cardinalfish (Phaeoptyx xenus)
Buru cardinalfish (Taeniamia buruensis)
Cave cardinalfish (Zapogon evermanni)

Ambassids 

Commerson's glassy perchlet (Ambassis ambassis)
Malabar glassy perchlet (Ambassis dussumieri)
Yellow-fin perchlet (Ambassis elongatus)
Bald glassy perchlet (Ambassis gymnocephalus)
Long-spined glassfish (Ambassis interrupta)
Macleayi's glassfish (Ambassis macleayi)
Estuary perchlet (Ambassis marianus)
Flag-tailed glassfish (Ambassis miops)
Scalloped perchlet (Ambassis nalua)
Bleeker's glass perchlet (Ambassis urotaenia)
Vachell's glassfish (Ambassis vachellii)
Elongate glassy perchlet (Chanda nama)
Parambassis apogonoides
Day's glassy perchlet (Parambassis dayi)
Parambassis ranga
Parambassis siamensis
Western ghat glassy perchlet (Parambassis thomassi)
Parambassis vollmeri
Parambassis wolffii
Himalayan glassy perchlet (Pseudambassis baculis)
Indian glass perch (Pseudambassis ranga)

Carangids 

Species

African threadfish (Alectis alexandrina)
African pompano (Alectis ciliaris)
Herring scad (Alepes vari)
Vadigo (Campogramma glaycos)
Threadfin jack (Carangoides otrynter)
Yellow jack (Caranx bartholomaei)
Green jack (Caranx caballus)
Pacific crevalle jack (Caranx caninus)
Blue runner (Caranx crysos)
Longfin crevalle jack (Caranx fischeri)
Crevalle jack (Caranx hippos)
Horse-eye jack (Caranx latus)
Black jack (Caranx lugubris)
False scad (Caranx rhonchus)
Bar jack (Caranx ruber)
Senegal jack (Caranx senegallus)
Bigeye trevally (Caranx sexfasciatus)
Cocinero (Caranx vinctus)
Atlantic bumper (Chloroscombrus chrysurus)
Pacific bumper (Chloroscombrus orqueta)
Mackerel scad (Decapterus macarellus)
Amberstripe scad (Decapterus muroadsi)
Round scad (Decapterus punctatus)
Indian scad (Decapterus russelli)
Roughear scad (Decapterus tabl)
Rainbow runner (Elagatis bipinnulata)
Palomette (Hemicaranx amblyrhynchus)
Hemicaranx bicolor
Yellowfin jack (Hemicaranx leucurus)
Blackfin jack (Hemicaranx zelotes)
Leerfish (Lichia amia)
Pilot fish (Naucrates ductor)
Longjaw leatherjacket (Oligoplites altus)
Maracaibo leatherjacket (Oligoplites palometa)
Shortjaw leatherjack (Oligoplites refulgens)
Castin leatherjacket (Oligoplites saliens)
Leatherjacket fish (Oligoplites saurus)
White trevally (Pseudocaranx dentex)
Bigeye scad (Selar crumenophthalmus)
Mexican lookdown (Selene brevoortii)
Full moonfish (Selene brownii)
Bluntnose (Selene dorsalis)
Mexican moonfish (Selene orstedii)
Pacific moonfish (Selene peruviana)
Atlantic moonfish (Selene setapinnis)
Lookdown (Selene vomer)
Guinean amberjack (Seriola carpenteri)
Greater amberjack (Seriola dumerili)
Lesser amberjack (Seriola fasciata)
California yellowtail (Seriola lalandi)
Darkfin amberjack (Seriola peruana)
Almaco jack (Seriola rivoliana)
Banded rudderfish (Seriola zonata)
Florida pompano (Trachinotus carolinus)
Cayenne pompano (Trachinotus cayennensis)
Permit (Trachinotus falcatus)
Streamers jack (Trachinotus goodei)
Trachinotus goreensis
Blackblotch pompano (Trachinotus kennedyi)
Trachinotus maxillosus
Short dorsal fin pompano (Trachinotus ovatus)
Paloma pompano (Trachinotus paitensis)
Gafftopsail pompano (Trachinotus rhodopus)
Steel pompano (Trachinotus stilbe)
Trachinotus teraia
Rough scad (Trachurus lathami)
Mediterranean horse mackerel (Trachurus mediterraneus)
Blue jack mackerel (Trachurus picturatus)
Pacific jack mackerel (Trachurus symmetricus)
Cunene horse mackerel (Trachurus trecae)
Whitetongue jack (Uraspis helvola)
Cottonmouth jack (Uraspis secunda)

Subspecies
Leathercoat (Oligoplites saurus inornatus)
Atlantic leatherjacket (Oligoplites saurus saurus)

Acanthurids 

Achilles tang (Acanthurus achilles)
Whitefin surgeonfish (Acanthurus albipectoralis)
Orange-socket surgeonfish (Acanthurus auranticavus)
Ocean surgeon (Acanthurus bahianus)
Roundspot surgeonfish (Acanthurus bariene)
Ringtail surgeonfish (Acanthurus blochii)
Doctorfish tang (Acanthurus chirurgus)
Blue doctorfish (Acanthurus coeruleus)
Eyestripe surgeonfish (Acanthurus dussumieri)
Horseshoe surgeonfish (Acanthurus fowleri)
Acanthurus gahhm
Finelined surgeonfish (Acanthurus grammoptilus)
Whitespotted surgeonfish (Acanthurus guttatus)
Japanese surgeonfish (Acanthurus japonicus)
Palelipped surgeonfish (Acanthurus leucocheilus)
Whitebar surgeonfish (Acanthurus leucopareius)
Powder blue surgeonfish (Acanthurus leucosternon)
Lined surgeonfish (Acanthurus lineatus)
Spotted-face surgeonfish (Acanthurus maculiceps)
Elongate surgeonfish (Acanthurus mata)
Monrovia surgeonfish (Acanthurus monroviae)
Whitecheek surgeonfish (Acanthurus nigricans)
Blackstreak surgeonfish (Acanthurus nigricauda)
Brown surgeonfish (Acanthurus nigrofuscus)
Acanthurus nigroris
Dropoff surgeonfish (Acanthurus nubilus)
Orange band surgeonfish (Acanthurus olivaceus)
Pacific mimic surgeon (Acanthurus pyroferus)
Marquesan surgeonfish (Acanthurus reversus)
Sohal surgeonfish (Acanthurus sohal)
Doubleband surgeonfish (Acanthurus tennentii)
Thompson's surgeonfish (Acanthurus thompsoni)
Acanthurus tractus 
Convict surgeonfish (Acanthurus triostegus)
Indian Ocean mimic surgeonfish (Acanthurus tristis)
Yellowfin surgeonfish (Acanthurus xanthopterus)
Two-spot bristletooth (Ctenochaetus binotatus)
Short-tail bristle-tooth (Ctenochaetus cyanocheilus)
Whitetail bristletooth (Ctenochaetus flavicauda)
Hawaiian bristletooth (Ctenochaetus hawaiiensis)
Blue-spotted bristletooth (Ctenochaetus marginatus)
Striated surgeonfish (Ctenochaetus striatus)
Goldring bristletooth (Ctenochaetus strigosus)
Orange-tipped bristletooth (Ctenochaetus tominiensis)
Squaretail bristletooth (Ctenochaetus truncatus)
Whitemargin unicornfish (Naso annulatus)
Humpback unicornfish (Naso brachycentron)
Short-nosed unicornfish (Naso brevirostris)
Bluetail unicornfish (Naso caeruleacauda)
Gray unicornfish (Naso caesius)
Elegant unicornfish (Naso elegans)
Horseface unicornfish (Naso fageni)
Sleek unicornfish (Naso hexacanthus)
Orange spine surgeonfish (Naso lituratus)
Slender unicornfish (Naso lopezi)
Naso maculatus
Squarenose unicornfish (Naso mcdadei)
Blackspine unicornfish (Naso minor)
Singlespine unicornfish (Naso thynnoides)
Bulbnose unicornfish (Naso tonganus)
Bluespine unicornfish (Naso unicornis)
Bignose unicornfish (Naso vlamingii)
Palette surgeonfish (Paracanthurus hepatus)
Biafra sawtail (Prionurus biafraensis)
Razor surgeonfish (Prionurus laticlavius)
Yellowspotted sawtail (Prionurus maculatus)
Sixplate sawtail (Prionurus microlepidotus)
Prionurus punctatus
Red Sea sailfin tang (Zebrasoma desjardinii)
Yellow tang (Zebrasoma flavescens)
Brushtail tang (Zebrasoma scopas)
Sailfin tang (Zebrasoma veliferum)
Purple Tang (Zebrasoma xanthurum)

Butterflyfishes 

Lord Howe Island butterflyfish (Amphichaetodon howensis)
Philippine butterflyfish (Chaetodon adiergastos)
Asian butterflyfish (Chaetodon argentatus)
Assarius butterflyfish (Chaetodon assarius)
Goldenrod butterflyfish (Chaetodon aureofasciatus)
Threadfin butterflyfish (Chaetodon auriga)
Oriental butterflyfish (Chaetodon auripes)
Blacktail butterflyfish (Chaetodon austriacus)
Eastern Triangle Butterflyfish (Chaetodon baronessa)
Blackburn's butterflyfish (Chaetodon blackburnii)
Black-barred butterflyfish (Chaetodon burgessi)
Foureye butterflyfish (Chaetodon capistratus)
Speckled butterflyfish (Chaetodon citrinellus)
Redtail butterflyfish (Chaetodon collare)
Wrought iron butterflyfish (Chaetodon daedalma)
Marquesan butterflyfish (Chaetodon declivis)
Indian vagabond butterflyfish (Chaetodon decussatus)
Oman butterflyfish (Chaetodon dialeucos)
African butterflyfish (Chaetodon dolosus)
Saddle butterflyfish (Chaetodon ephippium)
Blackwedged butterflyfish (Chaetodon falcula)
Diagonal butterflyfish (Chaetodon fasciatus)
Black butterflyfish (Chaetodon flavirostris)
Yellow-crowned butterflyfish (Chaetodon flavocoronatus)
Bluestripe butterflyfish (Chaetodon fremblii)
Gardiner's butterflyfish (Chaetodon gardineri)
Crochet butterflyfish (Chaetodon guentheri)
Peppered butterflyfish (Chaetodon guttatissimus)
Four-banded butterflyfish (Chaetodon hoefleri)
Chaetodon humeralis
Yellow teardrop butterflyfish (Chaetodon interruptus)
Sunburst butterflyfish (Chaetodon kleinii)
Blue chevron butterflyfish (Chaetodon larvatus)
Somali butterflyfish (Chaetodon leucopleura)
Lined butterflyfish (Chaetodon lineolatus)
Easter Island butterflyfish (Chaetodon litus)
Raccoon butterflyfish (Chaetodon lunula)
Oval butterflyfish (Chaetodon lunulatus)
Seychelles butterflyfish (Chaetodon madagaskariensis)
Marley's butterflyfish (Chaetodon marleyi)
Blackback butterflyfish (Chaetodon melannotus)
Arabian butterflyfish (Chaetodon melapterus)
Atoll butterflyfish (Chaetodon mertensii)
White-face butterflyfish (Chaetodon mesoleucos)
Scrawled butterflyfish (Chaetodon meyeri)
Millet butterflyfish (Chaetodon miliaris)
Indian butterflyfish (Chaetodon mitratus)
Pebbled butterflyfish (Chaetodon multicinctus)
Black-spotted butterflyfish (Chaetodon nigropunctatus)
Chaetodon nippon
Spotfin butterflyfish (Chaetodon ocellatus)
Eightband butterflyfish (Chaetodon octofasciatus)
Ornate butterflyfish (Chaetodon ornatissimus)
Spot-nape butterflyfish (Chaetodon oxycephalus)
Eritrean butterflyfish (Chaetodon paucifasciatus)
Dot-and-dash coralfish (Chaetodon pelewensis)
Chaetodon pictus
Blueblotch butterflyfish (Chaetodon plebeius)
Spotband butterflyfish (Chaetodon punctatofasciatus)
Fourspot butterflyfish (Chaetodon quadrimaculatus)
Latticed butterflyfish (Chaetodon rafflesii)
Three-banded butterflyfish (Chaetodon robustus)
Cunningfish (Chaetodon sanctaehelenae)
Reef butterflyfish (Chaetodon sedentarius)
Yellow-dotted butterflyfish (Chaetodon selene)
Dotted butterflyfish (Chaetodon semeion)
Bluecheek butterflyfish (Chaetodon semilarvatus)
Smith's butterflyfish (Chaetodon smithi)
Mirror butterflyfish (Chaetodon speculum)
Banded butterflyfish (Chaetodon striatus)
Hawaiian butterflyfish (Chaetodon tinkeri)
Herringbone butterflyfish (Chaetodon triangulum)
Tahitian butterflyfish (Chaetodon trichrous)
Three-striped butterflyfish (Chaetodon tricinctus)
Melon butterflyfish (Chaetodon trifasciatus)
Pacific double-saddle butterflyfish (Chaetodon ulietensis)
Teardrop butterflyfish (Chaetodon unimaculatus)
Vagabond butterflyfish (Chaetodon vagabundus)
Hongkong butterflyfish (Chaetodon wiebeli)
Yellowhead butterflyfish (Chaetodon xanthocephalus)
Pearlscale butterflyfish (Chaetodon xanthurus)
Zanzibar butterflyfish (Chaetodon zanzibarensis)
Margined coralfish (Chelmon marginalis)
Blackfin coralfish (Chelmon muelleri)
Copperband butterflyfish (Chelmon rostratus)
Western talma (Chelmonops curiosus)
Coralfish (Chelmonops truncatus)
High-fin butterflyfish (Coradion altivelis)
Golden-girdled coralfish (Coradion chrysozonus)
Twoeye coralfish (Coradion melanopus)
Yellow longnose butterflyfish (Forcipiger flavissimus)
Black long-nosed butterflyfish (Forcipiger longirostris)
Many-spined butterflyfish (Hemitaurichthys multispinosus)
Pyramid butterflyfish (Hemitaurichthys polylepis)
Thompson's butterflyfish (Hemitaurichthys thompsoni)
Black pyramid butterflyfish (Hemitaurichthys zoster)
Pennant coralfish (Heniochus acuminatus)
Horned coralfish (Heniochus chrysostomus)
Schooling bannerfish (Heniochus diphreutes)
Red Sea bannerfish (Heniochus intermedius)
Masked bannerfish (Heniochus monoceros)
Indian Ocean bannerfish (Heniochus pleurotaenia)
Singular bannerfish (Heniochus singularius)
Humphead bannerfish (Heniochus varius)
Barberfish (Johnrandallia nigrirostris)
Eye-spot butterflyfish (Parachaetodon ocellatus)
Longsnout butterflyfish (Prognathodes aculeatus)
Bank Butterflyfish (Prognathodes aya)
Prognathodes brasiliensis
Bastard cunningfish (Prognathodes dichrous)
Scythe butterflyfish (Prognathodes falcifer)
Guyana butterflyfish (Prognathodes guyanensis)
Prognathodes marcellae
Roa australis
Hawaiian gold-barred butterflyfish (Roa excelsa)
Indian golden-barred butterflyfish (Roa jayakari)
Brown-banded butterflyfish (Roa modestus)

Sand lances 

Gill's sand lance (Ammodytoides gilli)
Cape sandlance (Gymnammodytes capensis)
Mediterranean sand eel (Gymnammodytes cicerelus)
Gymnammodytes semisquamatus
Great sand eel (Hyperoplus lanceolatus)

Surfperches 

Calico surfperch (Amphistichus koelzi)
Shiner perch (Cymatogaster aggregata)
Tule perch (Hysterocarpus traskii)
Pile perch (Rhacochilus vacca)
Pink seaperch (Zalembius rosaceus)

Trichiuridae 

Intermediate scabbardfish (Aphanopus intermedius)
Mikhailin's scabbardfish (Aphanopus mikhailini)
Benthodesmus tenuis
Channel scabbardfish (Evoxymetopon taeniatus)
Lepidopus dubius
Largehead hairtail (Trichiurus lepturus)

Stargazers 

Northern stargazer (Astroscopus guttatus)
Southern stargazer (Astroscopus y-graecum)
Pacific stargazer (Astroscopus zephyreus)
Spotted stargazer (Genyagnus monopterygius)
Lancer stargazer (Kathetostoma albigutta)
Smooth stargazer (Kathetostoma averruncus)
Longspine stargazer (Uranoscopus albesca)
West African stargazer (Uranoscopus cadenati)
Japanese stargazer (Uranoscopus japonicus)
Drab nackednape stargazer (Uranoscopus oligolepis)
Whitespotted stargazer (Uranoscopus polli)
Atlantic stargazer (Uranoscopus scaber)
Freckled stargazer (Xenocephalus egregius)

Ponyfishes 

Threadfin ponyfish (Aurigequula fasciata)
Splendid ponyfish (Eubleekeria splendens)
Smalltoothed ponyfish (Gazza achlamys)
Toothed ponyfish (Gazza minuta)
Common ponyfish (Leiognathus equulus)
Haneda's ponyfish (Secutor hanedai)

Percophids 

Duckbill flathead (Bembrops anatirostris)
Bembrops cadenati
Goby flathead (Bembrops gobioides)
Bembrops greyi
Bembrops heterurus
Scaled-eye duckbill (Bembrops macromma)
Opalfish (Hemerocoetes monopterygius)

Pomfrets 

Atlantic pomfret (Brama brama)
Lesser bream (Brama dussumieri)
Pacific fanfish (Pteraclis aesticola)
Atlantic fanfish (Pterycombus brama)
Black pomfret (Taractes rubescens)
Big-scale pomfret (Taractichthys longipinnis)

Centracanthids 

Curled picarel (Centracanthus cirrus)
Bigeye picarel (Spicara alta)
Spicara australis
Spicara axillaris
Blotched picarel (Spicara maena)
Blackspot picarel (Spicara melanurus)
Blacktail picarel (Spicara nigricauda)
Deep-body pickarel (Spicara smaris)

Centrolophidae 

Black ruff (Centrolophus niger)
Black driftfish (Hyperoglyphe bythites)
Barrelfish (Hyperoglyphe perciformis)
Japanese butterfish (Psenopsis anomala)
Mocosa ruff (Schedophilus haedrichi)
New Zealand ruffe (Schedophilus huttoni)
Pemarco blackfish (Schedophilus pemarco)
Schedophilus velaini
White warehou (Seriolella caerulea)
Palm ruff (Seriolella violacea)

Centropomids 

Armed snook (Centropomus armatus)
Swordspine snook (Centropomus ensiferus)
Blackfin snook (Centropomus medius)
Largescale fat snook (Centropomus mexicanus)
Black robalo (Centropomus nigrescens)
Fat snook (Centropomus parallelus)
Tarpon snook (Centropomus pectinatus)
Yellowfin snook (Centropomus robalito)
Common snook (Centropomus undecimalis)
Humpback snook (Centropomus unionensis)
White snook (Centropomus viridis)

Ephippids 

Atlantic spadefish (Chaetodipterus faber)
West African spadefish (Chaetodipterus lippei)
Pacific spadefish (Chaetodipterus zonatus)
African spadefish (Ephippus goreensis)
Panama spadefish (Parapsettus panamensis)

Chiasmodontids 

Chiasmodon braueri
Black swallower (Chiasmodon niger)
Chiasmodon subniger
Dysalotus alcocki
Dysalotus oligoscolus
Kali indica
Kali kerberti
Kali macrodon
Kali macrura
Kali parri
Pseudoscopelus altipinnis
Pseudoscopelus scriptus
Pseudoscopelus scutatus

Driftfishes 

Blue fathead (Cubiceps caeruleus)
Cape fathead (Cubiceps capensis)
Longfin cigarfish (Cubiceps gracilis)
Bigeye cigarfish (Cubiceps pauciradiatus)
Man-of-war fish (Nomeus gronovii)
Banded driftfish (Psenes arafurensis)
Freckled driftfish (Psenes cyanophrys)
Bluefin driftfish (Psenes pellucidus)
Twospine driftfish (Psenes sio)

Mojarras 

Irish mojarra (Diapterus auratus)
Golden mojarra (Diapterus aureolus)
Peruvian mojarra (Diapterus peruvianus)
Rhombic mojarra (Diapterus rhombeus)
Spotfin mojarra (Eucinostomus argenteus)
Eucinostomus currani
Dow's mojarra (Eucinostomus dowii)
Darkspot mojarra (Eucinostomus entomelas)
Graceful mojarra (Eucinostomus gracilis)
Silver jenny (Eucinostomus gula)
Tidewater mojarra (Eucinostomus harengulus)
Bigeye mojarra (Eucinostomus havana)
Slender mojarra (Eucinostomus jonesii)
Mottled mojarra (Eucinostomus lefroyi)
Eucinostomus melanopterus
Maracaibo mojarra (Eugerres awlae)
Black axillary mojarra (Eugerres axillaris)
Brazilian mojarra (Eugerres brasilianus)
Short fin mojarra (Eugerres brevimanus)
Eugerres lineatus
Mexican mojarra (Eugerres mexicanus)
Striped mojarra (Eugerres plumieri)
Yellow fin mojarra (Gerres cinereus)
Deep-bodied mojarra (Gerres erythrourus)
Whipfin mojarra (Gerres filamentosus)
Gerres limbatus
Strongspine silver-biddy (Gerres longirostris)
Guinean striped mojarra (Gerres nigri)
Slender silver-biddy (Gerres oblongus)
Common silver-biddy (Gerres oyena)
Gerres simillimus
Common silver belly (Gerres subfasciatus)
Longfin mojarra (Pentaprion longimanus)

Moronids 

European seabass (Dicentrarchus labrax)
Spotted seabass (Dicentrarchus punctatus)
White perch (Morone americana)
White bass (Morone chrysops)
Yellow bass (Morone mississippiensis)
Striped bass (Morone saxatilis)

Gempylids 

Striped escolar (Diplospinus multistriatus)
Snake mackerel (Gempylus serpens)
Escolar (Lepidocybium flavobrunneum)
Black snake mackerel (Nealotus tripes)
Black gemfish (Nesiarchus nasutus)
Roudi escolar (Promethichthys prometheus)
Oilfish (Ruvettus pretiosus)

Remoras 

Live sharksucker (Echeneis naucrates)
Slender suckerfish (Phtheirichthys lineatus)
White suckerfish (Remora albescens)
Whalesucker (Remora australis)
Spearfish remora (Remora brachyptera)
Marlin sucker (Remora osteochir)
Common remora (Remora remora)

Deepwater cardinalfishes 

Epigonus affinis
Constance deepwater cardinalfish (Epigonus constanciae)
Pencil cardinal (Epigonus denticulatus)
Bigeye deepwater cardinalfish (Epigonus pandionis)
Deepsea cardinalfish (Epigonus telescopus)
Microichthys coccoi

Grammatids 

Yellowcheek basslet (Gramma linki)
Royal gramma (Gramma loreto)
Blackcap basslet (Gramma melacara)
Dusky basslet (Lipogramma anabantoides)
Banded basslet (Lipogramma evides)
Bicolor basslet (Lipogramma klayi)
Royal basslet (Lipogramma regia)
Rosy basslet (Lipogramma rosea)
Threeline basslet (Lipogramma trilineata)

Eelpout species 

Hadropareia middendorffii
Hadropogonichthys lindbergi
Iluocoetes elongatus
Lycenchelys hippopotamus
Lycenchelys monstrosa
Ebony eelpout (Lycodes concolor)
Shulupaoluk (Lycodes jugoricus)
Paamiut eelpout (Lycodes paamiuti)
Atlantic soft pout (Melanostigma atlanticum)
Pachycara bulbiceps
Pachycara crassiceps
Pachycara crossacanthum
Phucocoetes latitans

Priacanthids 

Glasseye snapper (Heteropriacanthus cruentatus)
Alalaua (Priacanthus alalaua)
Atlantic bigeye (Priacanthus arenatus)
Short bigeye (Pristigenys alta)
Popeye catalufa (Pristigenys serrula)

Opistognathids 

Higman's jawfish (Lonchopisthus higmani)
Palemouth jawfish (Lonchopisthus lemur)
Swordtail jawfish (Lonchopisthus micrognathus)
Longtailed jawfish (Lonchopisthus sinuscalifornicus)
Yellowhead jawfish (Opistognathus aurifrons)
Opistognathus fossoris
Galapagos jawfish (Opistognathus galapagensis)
Yellow jawfish (Opistognathus gilberti)
Scalecheek jawfish (Opistognathus leprocarus)
Moustache jawfish (Opistognathus lonchurus)
Banded jawfish (Opistognathus macrognathus)
Mottled jawfish (Opistognathus maxillosus)
Largescale jawfish (Opistognathus megalepis)
Megamouth jawfish (Opistognathus melachasme)
Yellowmouth jawfish (Opistognathus nothus)
Panamanian jawfish (Opistognathus panamaensis)
Finespotted jawfish (Opistognathus punctatus)
Giant jawfish (Opistognathus rhomaleus)
Opistognathus robinsi
Blue-spotted jawfish (Opistognathus rosenblatti)
Bullseye jawfish (Opistognathus scops)
Dark-spotted jawfish (Opistognathus signatus)
Dusky jawfish (Opistognathus whitehursti)

Nandids 

Nandus nandus
Nandus nebulosus
Nandus oxyrhynchus
Malayan leaffish (Pristolepis fasciata)
Malabar leaffish (Pristolepis marginata)

Sandperches 

Blue cod (Parapercis colias)
Blackflag sandperch (Parapercis signata)
Somali sandperch (Parapercis somaliensis)
Parapercis striolata
Peppered grubfish (Parapercis xanthozona)
Namorado sandperch (Pseudopercis numida)

Stromateids 

Gulf butterfish (Peprilus burti)
Pacific harvestfish (Peprilus medius)
American harvestfish (Peprilus paru)
Pacific butterfish (Peprilus simillimus)
Salema butterfish (Peprilus snyderi)
Blue butterfish (Stromateus fiatola)
Stromateus stellatus

Barracudas 

Guinean barracuda (Sphyraena afra)
Pacific barracuda (Sphyraena argentea)
Great barracuda (Sphyraena barracuda)
Northern sennet (Sphyraena borealis)
Mexican barracuda (Sphyraena ensis)
Guachanche barracuda (Sphyraena guachancho)
Pelican barracuda (Sphyraena idiastes)
European barracuda (Sphyraena sphyraena)
Yellowmouth barracuda (Sphyraena viridensis)

Acropomatids 

Blackmouth bass (Synagrops bellus)
Synagrops japonicus
Smallscale splitfin (Synagrops microlepis)
Keelcheek bass (Synagrops spinosus)
Threespine bass (Synagrops trispinosus)
Black verilus (Verilus sordidus)

Weevers 

Spotted weever (Trachinus araneus)
Guinean weever (Trachinus armatus)
Greater weever (Trachinus draco)
Striped weever (Trachinus lineolatus)
Cape Verde weever (Trachinus pellegrini)
Starry weever (Trachinus radiatus)

Other Perciformes species 

Akarotaxis nudiceps
Deepbody boarfish (Antigonia capros)
Shortspine boarfish (Antigonia combatia)
Silver-rag driftfish (Ariomma bondi)
Brown driftfish (Ariomma melanum)
Spotted driftfish (Ariomma regulus)
Artedidraco glareobarbatus
Bathydraco joannae
Blennodesmus scapularis
Bovichtus chilensis
Blue and gold fusilier (Caesio caerulaurea)
Parrot seaperch (Callanthias ruber)
Boarfish (Capros aper)
Barred seabass (Centrarchops chapini)
Red bandfish (Cepola macrophthalma)
Saddled sandburrower (Chalixodytes tauensis)
Champsodon capensis
Natal fingerfin (Chirodactylus jessicalenorum)
Congrogadus hierichthys
Coreoperca whiteheadi
Pompano dolphinfish (Coryphaena equiselis)
Mahi-mahi (Coryphaena hippurus)
Silver tiger fish (Datnioides polota)
African sicklefish (Drepane africana)
Everglades pygmy sunfish (Elassoma evergladei)
Gulf Coast pygmy sunfish (Elassoma gilberti)
Okefenokee pygmy sunfish (Elassoma okefenokee)
Banded pygmy sunfish (Elassoma zonatum)
Red rover (Emmelichthys ruber)
Atlantic rubyfish (Erythrocles monodi)
Two-spined blackfish (Gadopsis bispinosus)
Kissing gourami (Helostoma temminkii)
Atlantic pricklefish (Howella atlantica)
Indo-Pacific sailfish (Istiophorus platypterus)
Kraemeria tongaensis
Spotted flagtail (Kuhlia marginata)
Kuhlia mugil
Jungle perch (Kuhlia rupestris)
Incubator fish (Kurtus gulliveri)
Nile perch (Lates niloticus)
Sleek lates (Lates stappersii)
Atlantic emperor (Lethrinus atlanticus)
Red axil emperor (Lethrinus conchyliatus)
Blackeye emperor (Lethrinus enigmaticus)
Lancer (Lethrinus genivittatus)
Pacific tripletail (Lobotes pacificus)
Atlantic tripletail (Lobotes surinamensis)
Louvar (Luvarus imperialis)
Micropercops swinhonis
Redspine threadfin bream (Nemipterus nemurus)
Neodontobutis aurarmus
Paracaristius aquilus
Paracaristius nemorosus
Patagonotothen cornucola
Shortfin sweeper (Pempheris poeyi)
Glassy sweeper (Pempheris schomburgkii)
Bigspine boarfish (Pentaceros decacanthus)
Japanese armorhead (Pentaceros japonicus)
Blue whiptail (Pentapodus emeryii)
Tidepool gunnel (Pholis nebulosa)
Saddleback gunnel (Pholis ornata)
Platyberyx opalescens
Whitespotted longfin (Plesiops nigricans)
Antarctic silverfish (Pleuragramma antarctica)
Pogonophryne barsukovi
African leaffish (Polycentropsis abbreviata)
Forktail dottyback (Pseudochromis dixurus)
Striped dottyback (Pseudochromis sankeyi)
Cobia (Rachycentron canadum)
Racovitzia glacialis
Spotted scat (Scatophagus argus)
Stout infantfish (Schindleria brevipinguis)
Premature floater (Schindleria praematura)
Longfin escolar (Scombrolabrax heterolepis)
Magnificent rabbitfish (Siganus magnificus)
Marbled spinefoot (Siganus rivulatus)
Vermiculated spinefoot (Siganus vermiculatus)
Shortnose whiting (Sillago arabica)
Slender whiting (Sillago attenuata)
Japanese whiting (Sillago japonica)
Sineleotris chalmersi
Siniperca obscura
Slope bass (Symphysanodon berryi)
Fat slope bass (Symphysanodon octoactinus)
Bigeye squaretail (Tetragonurus atlanticus)
Smalleye squaretail (Tetragonurus cuvieri)
Mediterranean spearfish (Tetrapturus belone)
Longbill spearfish (Tetrapturus pfluegeri)
Banded archerfish (Toxotes jaculatrix)
Lorent'z archerfish (Toxotes lorentzi)
Smallscale archerfish (Toxotes microlepis)
Big scale archerfish (Toxotes oligolepis)
Freckled wriggler (Xenisthmus balius)
Swordfish (Xiphias gladius)

See also 
 Lists of IUCN Red List least concern species
 List of near threatened fishes
 List of vulnerable fishes
 List of endangered fishes
 List of critically endangered fishes
 List of recently extinct fishes
 List of data deficient fishes
 Sustainable seafood advisory lists and certification

Notes

References 

Fishes
Least concern fishes
Least concern fishes
Least concern fishes